= Galerie Pascal Cuisinier =

French designer company

- Industry: retail sale of second-hand goods in stores
- Founded: 2006
- Founder: Pascal Cuisinier
- Headquarters: Paris, France
- Website: http://www.galeriepascalcuisinier.com/

Founded in 2006, Galerie Pascal Cuisinier specializes in first generation modern French designers from 1951–1961, and is located adjacent to Square Gabriel-Pierné, just behind the Institut de France at 13 Rue de Seine — in Paris's 6th arrondissement.

== Pascal Cuisinier, founder of the gallery ==
Founder of the eponymous gallery, Pascal Cuisinier was born in 1969 in Saint-Germain-en-Laye. After studying architecture, he specialized in 1930s French Decorative arts and worked at the Antica market of Saint-Ouen.

He resumed his studies in plastic arts and art philosophy, and started work on a thesis entitled 'Towards an allographisation of contemporary plastic arts'. In 2006, he returned to Saint-Ouen, at the Paul Bert market, where he is recognized as the design specialist of the French generation born between 1920 and 1930, where the majority of production was produced between 1951 and 1961.

In 2011, he opened a space at 13 rue de Seine in Saint-Germain-des-Prés, divided between an exhibition space that displays furniture and rare pieces and a research and documentation office.

== The first generation of modern French designers ==
Since 2006, Galerie Pascal Cuisinier has advocated the generation of French designers born between 1925 and 1930, who all followed a similar path of education. Trained at either the National School of Decorative Arts (École nationale supérieure des arts décoratifs) or the Camondo School (École Camondo), they opened their agency in the early 1950s and then produced their first pieces. Modern and innovative, the pieces they designed were the start of what would become the method of production and distribution of furniture for the following decades, undertaking a shift from Decorative arts to design.

Without becoming a group or an artistic movement in its own right, these young designers were considered a 'generational phenomenon': they shared the same editorial choices and marked their era by participating in a notable artistic revival typical of the 1950s and 1960s.

== International fairs and exhibitions ==
Galerie Pascal Cuisinier often focuses on thematic or monographic exhibitions presented at its gallery or during international fairs such as PAD Paris, PAD London, Design Miami/ Basel, Design Miami, etc.

The exhibition '100 French chairs 1951–1961' showcased in 2014 is a perfect illustration of the gallery's approach. It unveiled the aesthetic and changes in form, which revolutionized the concept of seating in France during the 1950s. The same year, the gallery also paid tribute to Joseph-André Motte, on the first anniversary of his death with a solo show which displayed around fifty emblematic pieces created by the designer during his early career.

2015: Jacques Biny, Producer/Designer

2014: 100 French chairs 1951–1961

2014: Tribute to Joseph-André Motte

2013: Focus on André Simard

2012: Focus on Joseph-André Motte

2012: Pierre Guariche, Creator of Light / 1950–1959

2012: Cycle of thematic exhibitions 'First French design', episode #3: 'White’

2011: Cycle of thematic exhibitions 'First French design', episode #2: 'Young generation of the 1950s’

2010: Cycle of thematic exhibitions 'First French design', episode #1: 'Office’

2010: 'Meubles TV: Avant-garde designer 1952–1959’

2009: ‘Alain Richard, lighting and furniture 1950–1970’

== Designers represented by the gallery ==
Galerie Pascal Cuisinier houses works from the first generation of modern French designers:

- Janine Abraham and Dirk Jan Rol
- René-Jean Caillette
- Geneviève Dangles and Christian Defrance
- Pierre Guariche
- André Monpoix
- Michel Mortier
- Joseph-André Motte
- Pierre Paulin
- Antoine Philippon and Jacqueline Lecoq
- Alain Richard

The gallery also has a collection of French lighting from the 1950s and 1970s from the three main producers/designers of this era:

- Pierre Disderot
- Robert Mathieu
- Jacques Biny

== Publications ==
The gallery has published two standard works:

- Alain Richard, Luminaires et mobilier 1950–1970 – Premiers designers français. Galerie Pascal Cuisinier. 2010. ISBN 9782900013434.
- Meubles TV – Éditeur d'avant-garde 1952–1959. Galerie Pascal Cuisinier. 2010. ISBN 9782900013717.

== Bibliography ==
- Les Décorateurs des Années 50. Éditions Norma. 2012. ISBN 978-2915542486.
- Deligny, Pierre (2012). Airborne. Éditions les Modernistes. ISBN 978-2-95426-920-7.
- The Complete designer's lights (1950–1990). Clémence et Didier Krzentowski. 2011. ISBN 978-3-03764-199-6.
- Mobi Boom. L'explosion du design en France : 1945–1975. Éditions Les Arts Décoratifs. 2010. ISBN 978-2-916914-21-3.
- Pierre Paulin Designer. Archibooks and Grand Hornu Images. 2008.
- Favardin, Pierre (2007). Steiner et l'aventure du design. Norma Éditions. ISBN 978-2915542097.
- Catalogue Mobilier national 1964–2004 – 40 ans de création. Réunion des musées nationaux – Grand Palais, Les éditions Rmn-Grand Palais. 2004. ISBN 9782711848553.
