= Marcel Gascoin =

French designer

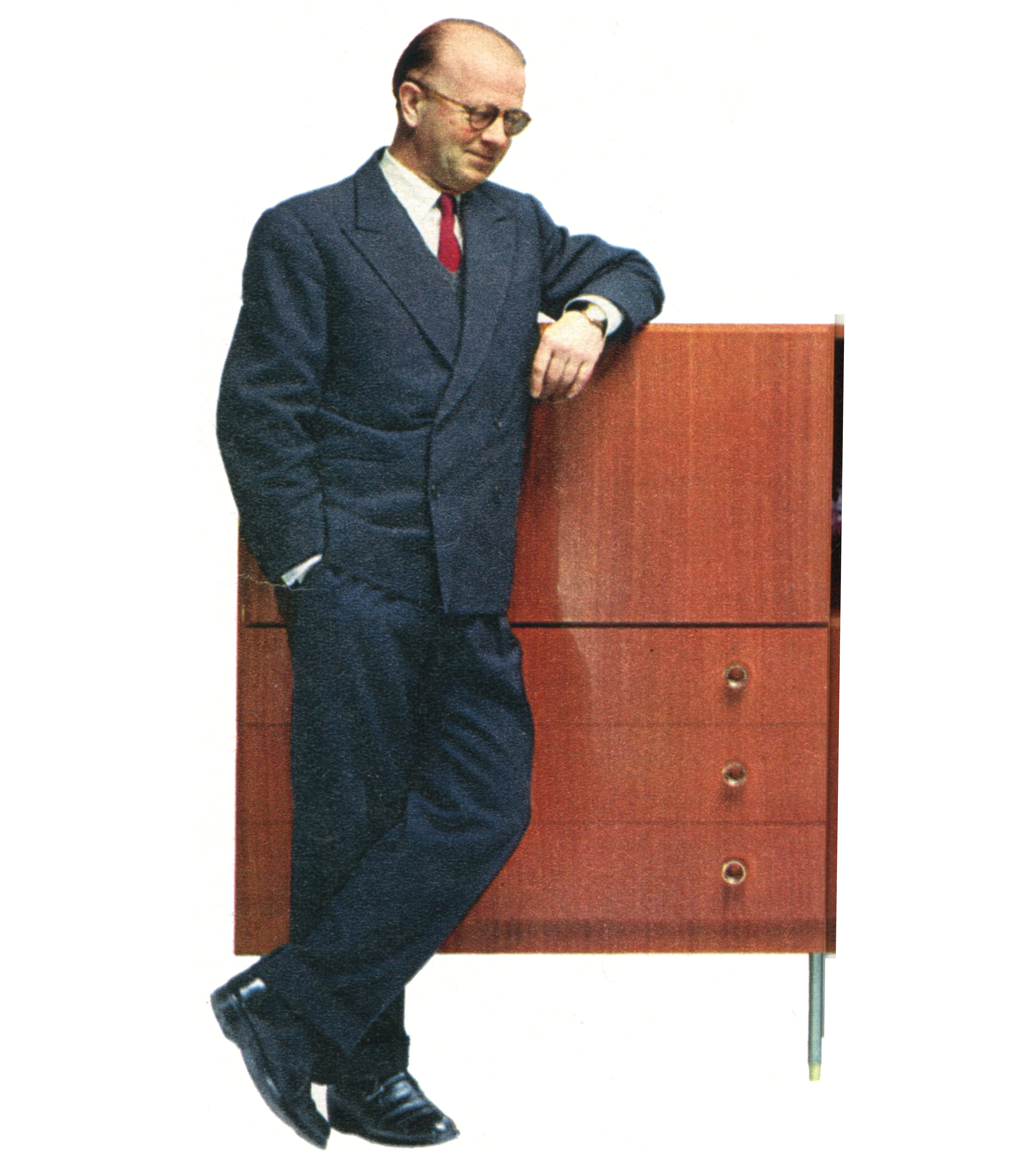
- Gascoin in 1962
- Born: 24 August 1907; Le Havre, France
- Died: 29 October 1986 (aged 79); Paris, France
- Occupation: Designer
- Known for: Furniture sets

Marcel Gascoin (24 August 1907 – 29 October 1986) was a designer who specialized in modular storage units and sets of matching furniture. He played a major role in the emergence of French design after World War II (1939–1945). Several of Gascoin's apprentices went on to distinguished careers as designers in their own right.

== Early years ==
Marcel Gascoin was born on 24 August 1907 in Le Havre. His father and grandfather were both mariners, and from a young age he was interested in the precision of a boat's interior design. He studied as an interior decorator at the École nationale supérieure des arts décoratifs. His teacher Henri Sauvage interested him in the search for a new architecture for public housing. He also trained at the Ecole des beaux-arts du Havre as a carpenter and cabinet maker. Gascoin exhibited for the first time in 1930 at the Union des artistes modernes (UAM) at the recommendation of the well-known architect and designer Robert Mallet-Stevens. In 1934 he collaborated with Jean Prouvé in a craft competition to design a practical and aesthetically pleasing boat cabin. In 1936 he submitted school furniture in a UAM competition.

== Post war ==
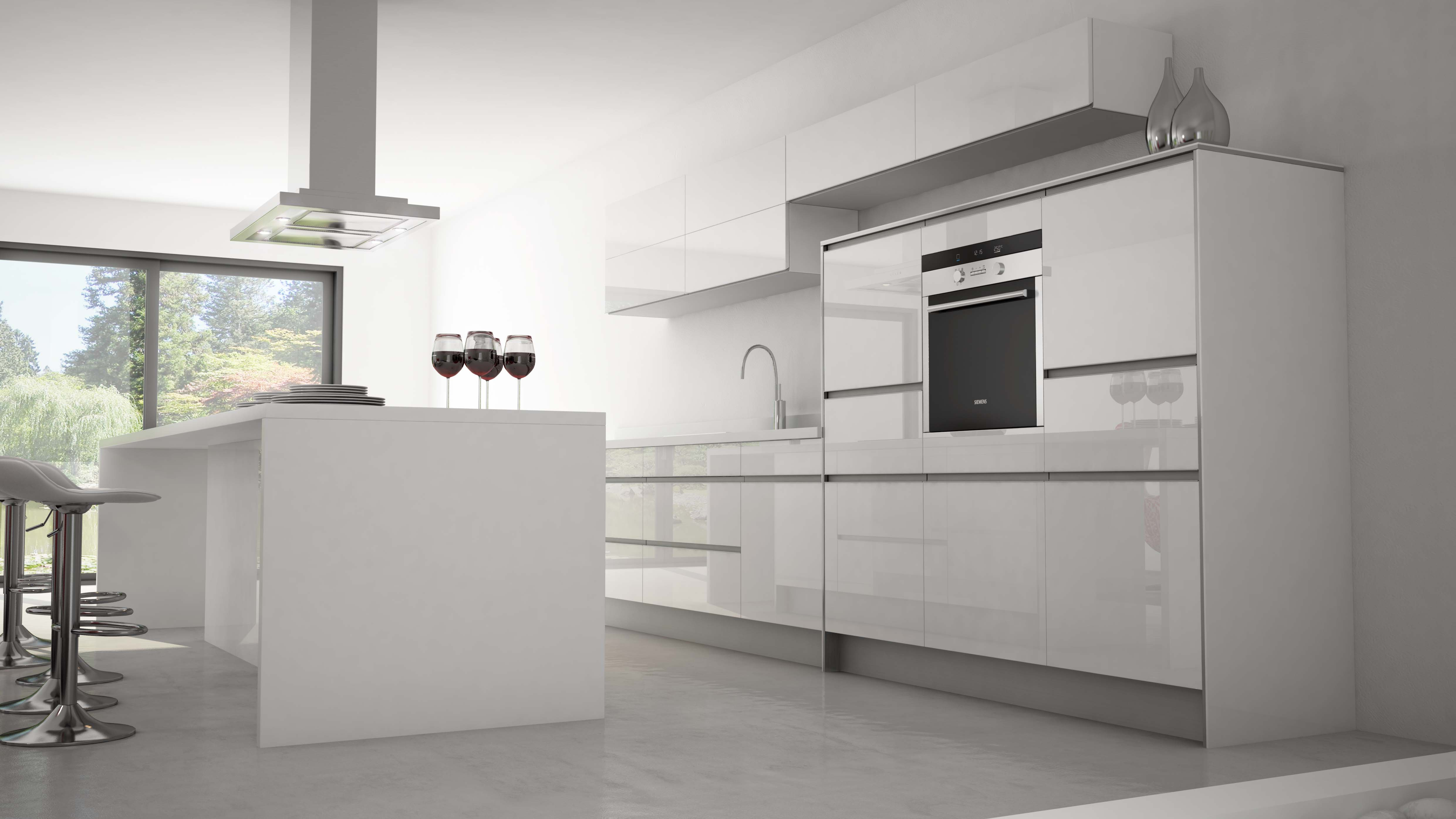
Comera kitchen interior from 2010

In 1945 Gascoin founded Comera, the COmpagnie des MEubles RAtionnels, which became Comera Cuisines, specializing in kitchen design. Gascoin developed the innovative concept of modular storage units that could fit together to make optimal use of available space. Comera Cuisines expanded steadily in the 1960s and 1970s, and in the 1980s began selling in other countries, particularly the United Kingdom. The company continued to sell fitted kitchens in the 21st century.

In the period of recovery and reconstruction after World War II (1939–1945) there was high demand for reasonably priced home products. There was increased interest in using new methods and materials for mass production of furniture. Manufacturers of materials such as formica, plywood, aluminum, and steel sponsored the salons of the Société des artistes décorateurs. Designers who exhibited their experimental work at the salons in this period included Jacqueline Lecoq, Antoine Philippon, René-Jean Caillette, Joseph-André Motte, Jean Prouvé, Charlotte Perriand and Pierre Guariche. Lecoq, Philippon, Motte, and Guariche all worked for Gascoin's studio.

Gascoin was involved in the reconstruction of Le Havre led by Auguste Perret. In 1949 Gascoin founded ARHEC, Aménagement rationnel de l'habitation et des collectivités (Rational Improvement of Housing and Communities), to produce and distribute furniture sets. He also founded Rangement Gascoin, which made storage units. In Gascoin's 8-piece "Logis 1949" display at the Salon des arts ménagers the kitchen played a central role and followed the ergonomic principles spelled out by Paulette Bernège in the inter-war period. From 1952 he used the Loison Frères company to make and distribute his furniture, which sold in the department stores at affordable prices.

Marcel Gascoin died on 29 October 1986 in Paris, aged 79.

== Pupils ==
Pierre Guariche (1926–1995) joined Gascoin's studio in 1949. Guariche soon began to exhibit his own work in the Salon des Arts Ménagers and the Salon des Artistes Décorateurs. Joseph-André Motte (1925–2013) was another pupil in Gascoin's workshop who went on to a brilliant career. Jacqueline Lecoq (born 1932) joined Gascoin's company, where in 1954 she met her future partner Antoine Philippon (1930–1995). Lecoq and Philippon became renowned for stylistic purity and respect for material. Other talented pupils were Pierre Paulin (1927–2009) and Michel Mortier (born 1925).

== Work ==
Gascoin is recognized for his important role in post-war design, as one of the first to produce furniture sets. He was inspired by marine furniture throughout his career. Marine furniture gave him the concept of "adapting the container to the content." His designs always followed the basic criteria of functionality and practicality. His furniture sets were mobile and modular, elegant, well-built and ergonomic, a model of modernity.

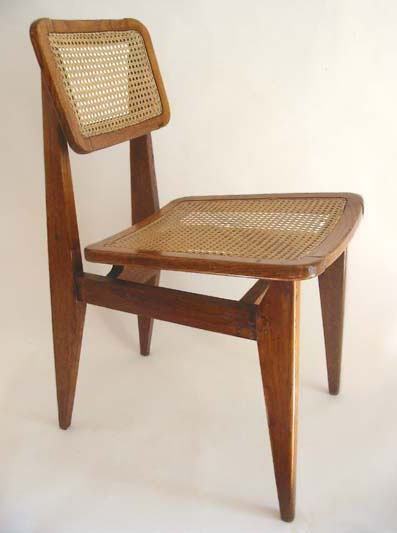
Chair

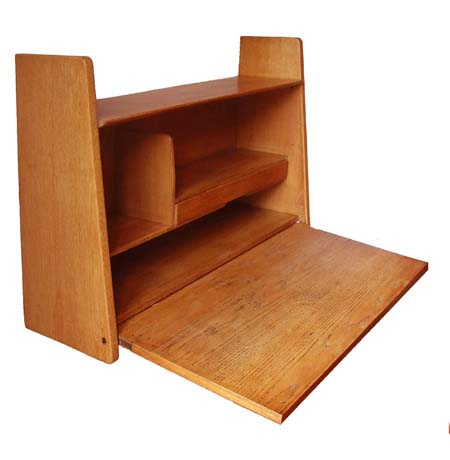
Writing desk

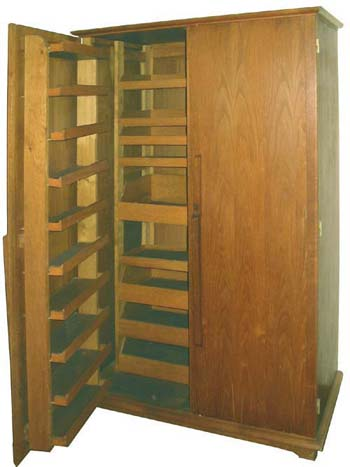
Armoire

== Publications ==
- Paul Le Saux; avec le concours de Marcel Gascoin, P. Grandin et de Georges Petillon (1950). Manuel de la maison rurale. Rennes: Association des Amis de la maison paysanne.

== Sources ==
- "A propos de Marcel Gascoin". Ateliers-crea.
- "Antoine Philippon/Jacqueline Lecoq". Demisch Danant.
- Bony, Anne; Rakočević, Ivan (2005). Furniture & interiors of the 1970s. Flammarion. ISBN 9782080304896.
- Delaporte, Guillemette (2010). Marcel Gascoin: décorateur des trente glorieuses. Norma. ISBN 978-2-915542-33-2.
- "Gascoin, Marcel (1907-1986)". BnF.
- "Joseph André Motte". Demische Danant.
- "Les Salon des Artistes Décorateurs". Demisch Danant. 2010-10-20. Archived from the original on 2015-04-11.
- Leymonerie, Claire (2006). "Le Salon des arts ménagers dans les années 1950". Vingtième Siècle. Revue d'histoire (in French). 3 (91). Presses de Sciences Po (P.F.N.S.P.).
- Prodhon, Françoise-Claire (May–June 2006). "PIERRE GUARICHE". Intramuros (124). Archived from the original on 2015-05-21.
- "The fitted kitchen inventor". Comera Cuisines. Archived from the original on 2015-08-12.
