= Robert Bonfils =

Robert Bonfils may refer to:

- Robert Bonfils (American illustrator) (1922–2018)
- Robert Bonfils (French illustrator) (1886–1971), French illustrator, painter and designer
