= Jacques Adnet =

Designer, architect and interior designer

Jacques Adnet

Jacques Adnet (20 April 1900 – 29 October 1984) was a French art deco modernist designer, architect and interior designer.

He was known for his furniture designs in leather.

== Education ==
Jacques Adnet was a French designer associated with modernist design in the 20th century. He studied at the Municipal School of Design in Auxerre and later attended the École des Beaux-Arts in Paris.

He believed in the functional aspect of furniture combined with geometrical simplicity. Jacques Adnet was inspired by pre-classical styles and was well acquainted with traditional furniture. Until the age of 28, Jacques lived and worked hand in hand with his twin brother Jean at the Studio La Maitrise, where they met the Art Déco designer Maurice Dufrene. From 1928 to 1960, he directed La Compagnie des Arts Francais. His team of decorators included Francois Jourdain, Charlotte Perriand and Georges Jouve. Adnet presided over the Salon des Artistes Decorateurs from 1947 to 1949. During the 1950s, he created furniture and concentrated on the numerous commissions he received, such as the decoration of the private apartments of the President at the Elysée Palace or the meeting room of the UNESCO headquarters in Paris. In 1959 he became the director of École nationale supérieure des arts décoratifs in Paris until 1970.

== Selected works ==
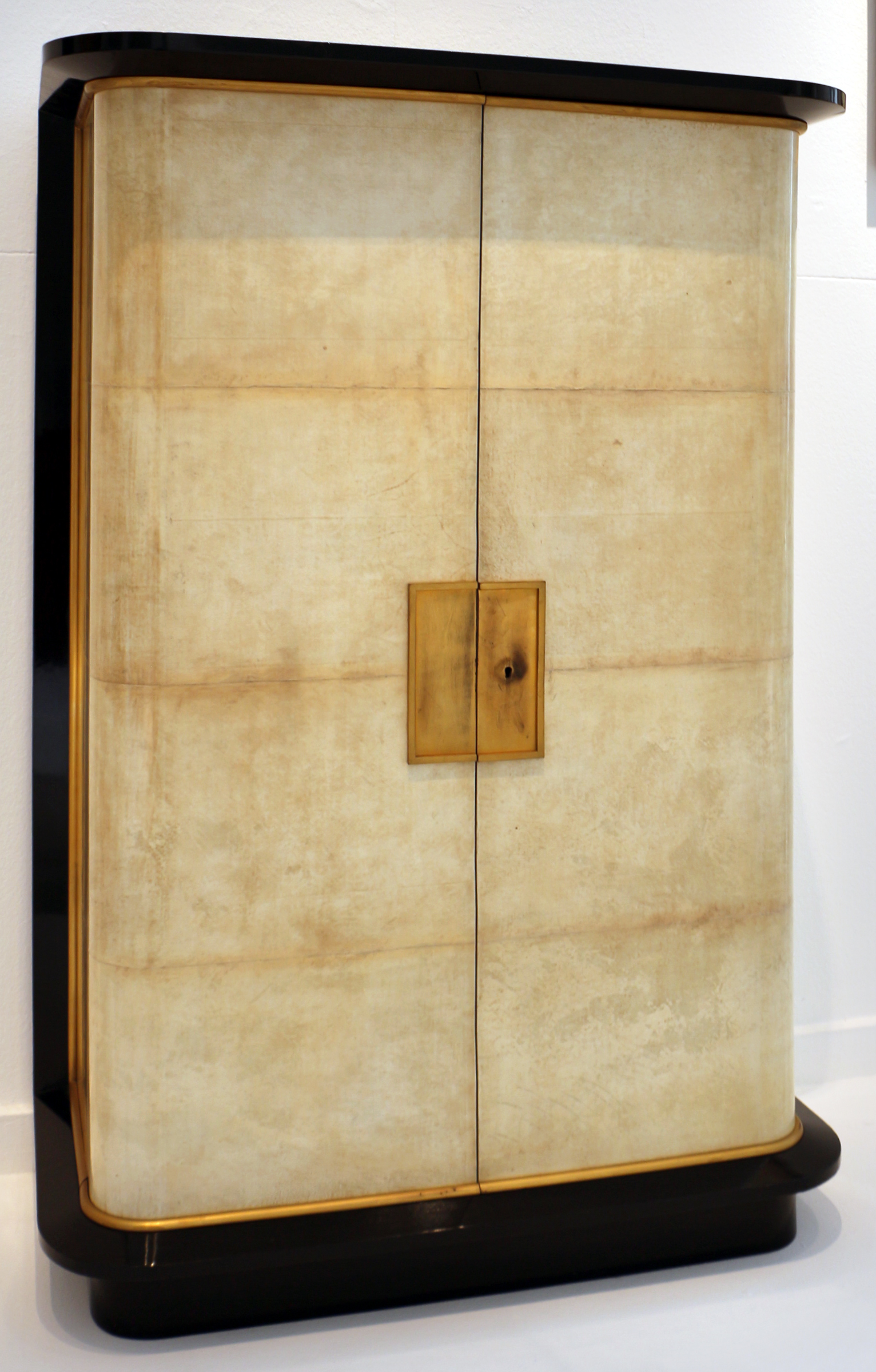
Cabinet (1937)

Adnet exhibited at the 1925 Exposition Internationale des Arts Décoratifs et Industriels Modernes. Distinctly avant garde, Adnet and was among the first to expect metal and glass to integrate with the structure and decoration of furniture.

In 1926 he designed the salle commune of the Ile-de-France.

By 1928, had become Director of La Compagnie des Arts Français (CAF) - at the age of 28.

CAF provided Adnet with an ideal platform from which to promote his modernist designs.

These incorporated precious woods, chromed metals, embellishments such as mirror, leather, parchment and smoked glass in linear styles with decoration pared away wherever possible. In 1970 Adnet became director of École nationale supérieure des arts décoratifs.

== Death ==
He died in 1984 having created a legacy of fine design that feels "modern" even today.

== Honors and Awards ==
- Officer of the Ordre des Palmes Académiques
- Officer of the Ordre des Arts et des Lettres
- Officer of the Order of Legion of Honour
