= Etienne-Henri Martin =

French designer and decorator (1905–1997)

- Born: 7 April 1905; Paris, France
- Died: 1997 (aged 91–92)
- Education: École Boulle
- Occupations: Decorator, furniture designer

Etienne-Henri Martin (7 April 1905 – 1997) was a French designer and decorator whose work combined elements of classic and avant-garde French design.

He undertook many private and public decoration projects, and led the design workshops of major department stores in France and Belgium. From 1950, he was a professor at the École nationale supérieure des arts décoratifs in Paris.

== Earky life and education ==
Etienne Henri Martin was born in Paris on 7 April 1905.

He studied at the École Boulle in Paris, where he specialized in metal.

== Career ==
Martin worked with Edgar Brandt from 1923 to 1928. During this period, he exhibited at the Salon des Artistes Décorateurs (SAD) in Paris.

He decorated the reception room for the city of Paris at the 1925 International Exhibition of Modern Decorative and Industrial Arts, held in Paris, for which he was awarded the Grand Prize.

Martin worked for the Primavera workshop of the Printemps department store.

He became head of an agency and a collaborator with René Prou.

Martin worked on many private and public commissions in France and Belgium, worked on decoration of passenger ships and worked with Prou on the decoration of the Council Chamber of the League of Nations in Geneva.

He was artistic director of the Studium Louvre, the creative workshop of the Grands Magasins du Louvre, from 1938 to 1945. The workshop produced designs for the growing number of customers who wanted modern styles of decoration. The designer Michel Mortier joined the Studium-Louvre in 1944.

He became artistic and technical director for the Le Bon Marché department stores in Brussels, Belgium, where he stayed until 1950.

After his return from Beussels, he again participated in the Salon des Artistes Décorateurs (SAD) and the Salon des Arts Ménagers in Paris.

From 1950, he was a professor at the École nationale supérieure des arts décoratifs in Paris. He was also an honorary professor at the Ecole des Arts appliqués. He was a member of the SAD Committee, and the treasurer of the SAD.

One of his pieces of furniture was acquired by the state and is held by the Musée National d'Art Moderne.

=== Awards ===
Martin was awarded the Prix Blumenthal.

=== Style ===
Martin's work has elements of traditional decorative art and elements of avant-garde. Towards the end of his career, he moved toward freer forms.

== Death ==
Martin died in 1997.

== Sources ==
- "Etienne-Henri Martin". De Moyencourt. Archived from the original on 3 October 2015.
- "Etienne-Henri Martin" (in French). Steiner Paris. Archived from the original on 4 March 2016.
- Lorelle, Véronique (4 June 2015). "Michel Mortier, designer de la modernité, est mort". Le Monde (in French).
- "MARTIN Etienne-Henri". Mobilier et Decoration (in French) (1). February 1955. Archived from the original on 11 November 2014.
- "Paire de chauffeuses " 1500 " par Étienne-Henri Martin pour Thevenon, Fert et Fa". à demain.
