= Joseph-André Motte =

French designer (1925–2013)

- Born: 6 January 1925; Saint-Bonnet-en-Champsaur, France
- Died: 1 June 2013 (aged 88); Paris, France
- Education: École nationale supérieure des arts appliqués et des métiers d'art
- Known for: Furniture Design; Interior Design
- Awards: Silver medal Triennale di Milano, 1st prize, Concours National du Centre Technique du Bois (1956), Award René Gabriel (1957), Grand Prix Brussels World's Fair Expo 58 (1958), 1st Prize Concours des Glaces de Boussois (1960), 1st Prize Mazda, Formica, Surnyl Contest (1960/1964), Silver medal, Médaille d'Or, Médaille d'Honneur de la Société d'Encouragement à l'Art et à l'Industrie (1957,1958, 1965), French Academy of Architecture award (1982), Commander 'Ordre des Arts et Lettres' (1990)

Joseph-André Motte (6 January 1925 – 1 June 2013) was a French furniture and interior designer. He ranks among the most influential and innovative figures in post-war French design.

== Early life ==
Born in Saint-Bonnet-en-Champsaur, Hautes-Alpes, Motte studied at the École nationale supérieure des arts appliqués et des métiers d'art in Paris. He graduated in 1948 at the top of his class.

== Furniture design ==
After World War II, designers embraced new materials such as Formica, plywood, aluminum, and steel for mass-produced furniture. Manufacturers sponsored salons of the Société des artistes décorateurs, where Motte, alongside Pierre Guariche, René-Jean Caillette, Jean Prouvé, Charlotte Perriand, Antoine Philippon, and Jacqueline Lecoq, showcased experimental work. Motte began designing furniture at Bon Marché, a prominent Parisian department store, and collaborated with Marcel Gascoin’s workshop. In 1954, he founded his own agency and co-established the Atelier de Recherche Plastique (Studio for Plastic Research) with Michel Mortier and Pierre Guariche. His designs modernized French homes by blending traditional materials like rattan with modern ones, including foam, plastic, Formica, plywood, stainless steel, and glass, combining contemporary forms with conventional techniques. His notable chairs include the Tripod Chair (1949), Catherine Chair (1952), Sabre Chair (1954), 740 Chair (1957), and 770 Chair (1958). He also designed office furniture, tables, lights, and sanitary and heating facilities.

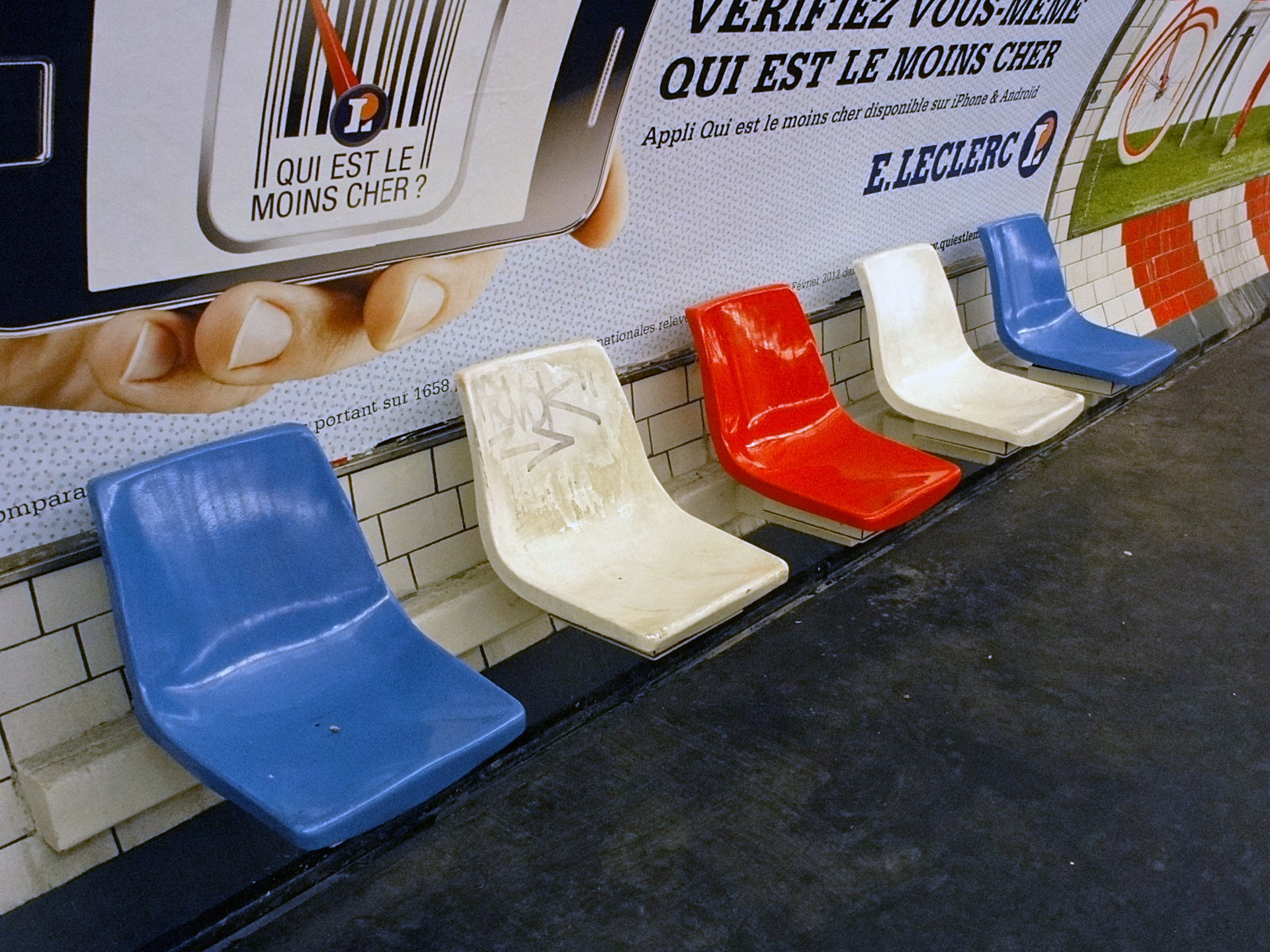
Motte designed seating in the Paris Métro

Motte and Paul Andreu created the 1970s “Motte-Andreu style” shell seating for the Paris Métro, used from 1974 to 1984. He exhibited at events such as the Salon des artistes décorateurs, Salon des arts ménagers, and Brussels Expo '58.

== Interior design ==
Beginning in the 1960s, Motte focused on interior design, leading major public projects for the French government, including:

- Over 100 Paris Métro stations
- Interiors and furnishings for Orly Airport
- Interiors and furnishings for Charles de Gaulle Airport
- Interiors and furnishings for Lyon Airport
- Sections of the Louvre Museum
- Parts of the state radio’s Broadcasting House in Paris
- French prefectures and town halls
- The Council of Europe in Strasbourg

He also designed interiors abroad, including the presidential palace in Bamako and hotels in Algeria, Tunisia, Congo, and Mali.

== Recognition ==
- La Triennale di Milano (1990)
- Prix René Gabriel.
- Ordre des Arts et des Lettres (Commander rank) (1990).

== See also ==
- Joseph-André Motte
- Architecture of the Paris Métro
