= Bonfils =

Bonfils is a surname of French origin, meaning "good son". Notable people with the surname include:

- Félix Bonfils (1831–1885), French photographer and writer
- Frederick Gilmer Bonfils (1860–1933), American publisher, owner of the Denver Post
- Helen Bonfils (1889–1972), American philanthropist and supporter of the arts, daughter of Frederick Gilmer Bonfils
- Jean Bonfils (bishop) (1930–2026), French Roman Catholic bishop
- Jean Bonfils (composer) (1921–2007), French organist, music educator, musicologist and composer
- Khan Bonfils (1972–2015), British actor and performer
- Marie-Lydie Cabanis Bonfils (1837–1918), French photographer
- Rémi Bonfils (born 1988), French rugbist
- Robert Bonfils (American illustrator) (1922–2018)
- Robert Bonfils (French designer) (1886–1972)
- Winifred Bonfils (1863–1936), American journalist

== See also ==
- Monfils (surname)
