= Cuisinier =

Cuisinier may refer to:

== Books ==
- Le Cusinier, Pierre de Lune (1656)
- Le Cuisinier Royal François Massialot
- Le Cuisinier Impérial (1806)
- Le cuisinier françois (1651)

== Other ==
- The cuisinier, a title for a cook under brigade de cuisine
- Galerie Pascal Cuisinier, art gallery in Paris
