= Jacqueline Lecoq =

French designer (born 1932)

- Born: 1932 (age 93–94)
- Occupation: Designer
- Known for: Minimalist furniture designs

Jacqueline Lecoq (born 1932) is a French designer who collaborated for many years with Antoine Philippon. They produced furniture designs that were modern, simple and minimalist, often using large glass plates as both surfaces and supports.

== Life ==
Jacqueline Lecoq was born in 1932. She trained at the École nationale supérieure des arts décoratifs in the studio of Eric Bagge (1890–1978). After graduating she joined Marcel Gascoin's company. In the period after World War II (1939–45) there was increased interest in using new methods and materials for mass production of furniture. Manufacturers of materials such as formica, plywood, aluminum, and steel sponsored the salons of the Société des artistes décorateurs. Designers who exhibited their experimental work at the salons in this period included Jacqueline Lecoq, Antoine Philippon, René-Jean Caillette, Joseph-André Motte, Jean Prouvé, Charlotte Perriand and Pierre Guariche.

In 1954 Lecoq met Antoine Philippon (1930–95), who had trained at the École Boulle, and was also working for Gascoin. Lecoq and Philippon formed a partnership in 1956 that would last until Philippon's death in 1995. During their long career they often showed their creations at the Salon des arts ménagers and the Salon des artistes décorateurs. Philippon was president of the latter in 1970–72. They participated in world exhibitions in Brussels (1958) where they won the grand prize for their "young man's room" and Montreal (1967). In 1961 they received the René Gabriel prize.

== Work ==
Lecoq and Philippon were among the masters of the Union des artistes modernes (UAM). They followed Jean Prouvé in using contemporary materials and industrial techniques to design good-quality products at economical prices. At first they met resistance, but they continued to insist on creating uncompromising pieces that combined function and art, and this style was soon accepted by young people who wanted modern but timeless furniture. As with others of the UAM they preferred materials such as glass, aluminum and Formica. They aimed for comfortable, elegant and functional furniture with pure lines, free of decoration. Their office furniture was minimalist, and through its use of large glass plates was almost immaterial. Their achievements included bending post-formed Formica in a small radius of 2 centimetres (0.79 in), and designing a TV with the cathode ray rube mounted on a movable axle above a base cabinet containing the speakers. This was typical of their drive for efficient use of interior space.

== Sources ==
- "Antoine Philippon/Jacqueline Lecoq". Demisch Danant.
- "Antoine Philippon / Jacqueline Lecoq". Galerie Philippe Jousse.
- Bony, Anne; Rakočević, Ivan (2005). Furniture & interiors of the 1970s. Flammarion. ISBN 9782080304896.
- "Les Salon des Artistes Décorateurs". Demisch Danant. 2010-10-20. Archived from the original on 2015-04-11.
- "Meuble TV, tourne-disque et bar". Musée Les Arts Décoratifs.
