= Pierre Guariche =

French designer and architect (1926–1995)

- Born: 1926; Paris, France
- Died: 1995 (aged 68–69); Bandol, France
- Occupations: Designer, interior decorator, architect

Pierre Guariche (1926–1995) was a French designer, interior decorator and architect. He is perhaps best known for the residential lights that he designed for Pierre Disderot in the 1950s, but he was also an innovative furniture designer and architect.

== Early years ==
Pierre Guariche was born in 1926, son of a family of Parisian goldsmiths. He studied at the École nationale supérieure des arts décoratifs, where he was taught by René Gabriel. He graduated in the Spring of 1949. He became a member of the Union des artistes modernes (UAM). He joined the studio of another of his teachers, Marcel Gascoin. He began to exhibit his own work in the Salon des Arts Ménagers and the Salon des Artistes Décorateurs. In the period after World War II (1939–1945) there was increased interest in using new methods and materials for mass production of furniture. Manufacturers of materials such as formica, plywood, aluminum, and steel sponsored the salons of the Société des artistes décorateurs. Designers who exhibited their experimental work at the salons in this period included Guariche, René-Jean Caillette, Joseph-André Motte, Jean Prouvé, Charlotte Perriand, Antoine Philippon and Jacqueline Lecoq.

== Career ==
Guariche was quickly noticed. The MAI gallery exhibited some of his furniture, and then he was employed by the new company Airborne, founded in 1951. Guariche proposed a complete suite of furniture for a house, which he called "Prefacto", as his first project for Airborne. Using metal tubes and wood he created furniture for the different rooms in a dwelling, including tables, chairs and modular storage units. He also designed a very successful line of chairs, armchairs and sofas for Airborne.

In 1951 Guariche began to collaborate with Steiner, another major furniture manufacturer. He designed the innovative chair called "tonneau", with a plastic and aluminum version in 1953 and a bent plywood version in 1954. The "tonneau" was easy to manufacture and inexpensive, and was extremely successful. In the same period Guariche made many models for the lighting manufacturer Pierre Disderot, including hanging lights, standing lights and table lamps. He was looking for a modern, straightforward and economical alternative to the opulence of traditional French designs and the hard chic of the prewar modernists. The lights often included a counterbalance to give harmony to the form. They may be the work for which he is most remembered.

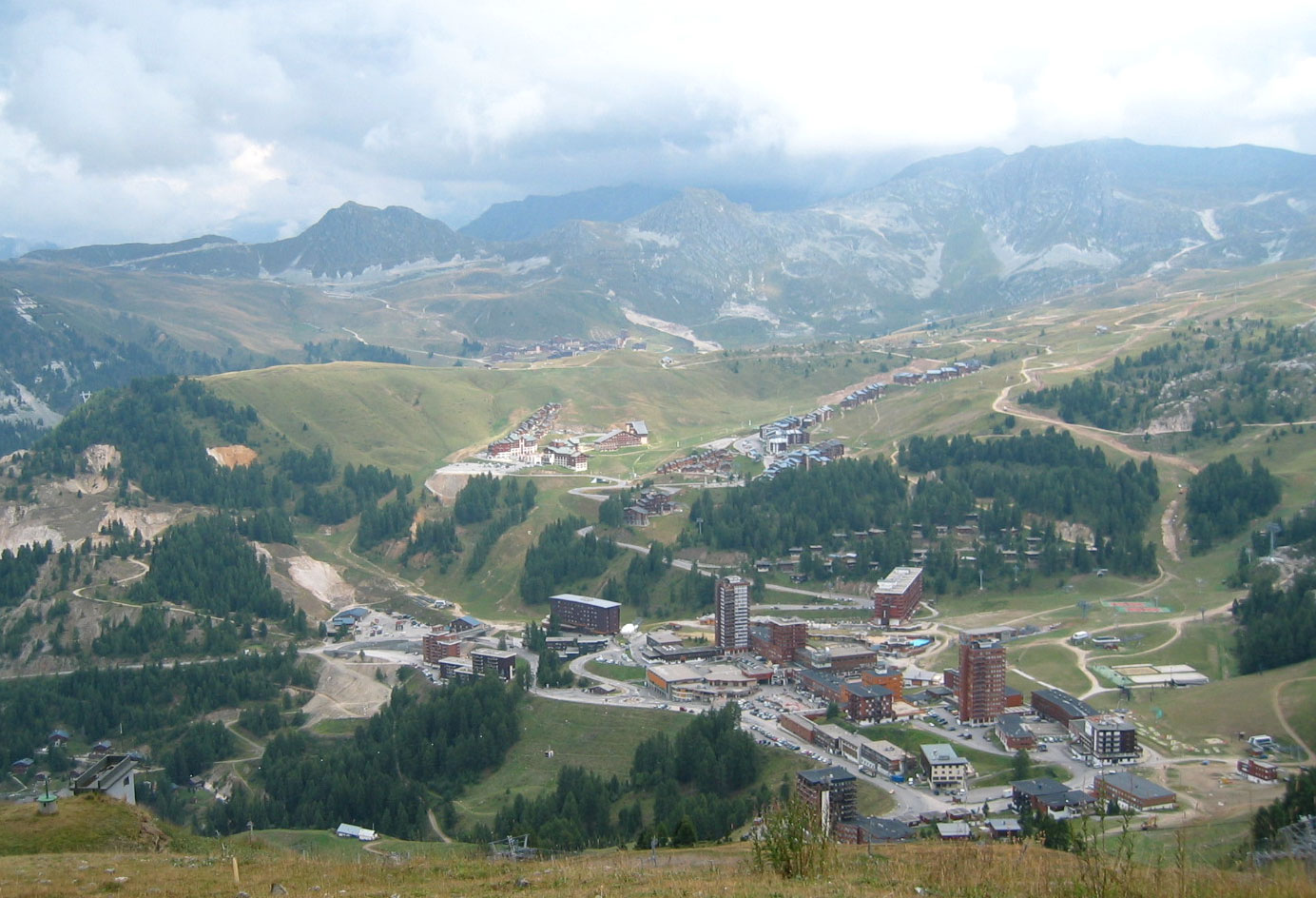
Plagne Centre, which Guariche designed

In 1954 Guariche formed an association called the Atelier de Recherche Plastique (ARP: Plastic Research Workshop) with Michel Mortier and Joseph-André Motte, whom he had met in the Gascoin studio. For about three years the ARP designed a wide range of furniture for the living room, parent's bedroom and child's bedroom for the manufacturer Charles Minvielle. Guariche also designed a range of office furniture for Charles Minvielle. In 1957 Guariche became artistic director for the Meurop furniture maker in Belgium. The furniture he designed for Meurop was both elegant and very economical.

Guariche saw himself primarily as an architect, and his furniture reflects his concern with form and volume. He designed various private homes. In the 1960s he also engaged in interior design for offices and shops. He helped with the design of a station in the winter sports resort La Plagne and the interior of the Firminy hospital. Guariche was named consulting architect for the Caisse des dépôts et consignations, Société Nationale de Construction de logements pour les Travailleurs (Sonacotra) and Ogirep. He also taught at the École nationale supérieure des arts décoratifs in Paris and the Ecole Supérieure d’Architecture in Tournai, Belgium.

Pierre Guariche was awarded the René Gabriel prize in 1965. He died in 1995.

== Sources ==
- Favardin, Patrick (2002). Les Décorateurs des années 1950. Paris: Editions Norma.
- Fiell, Charlotte; Fiell, Peter (2005). 1000 Lights: 1878-1959. Taschen. ISBN 978-3-8228-1606-6.
- "Les Salon des Artistes Décorateurs". Demisch Danant. 2010-10-20. Archived from the original on 2015-04-11.
- "Pierre Guariche". Demisch Danant.
- Prodhon, Françoise-Claire (May–June 2006). "PIERRE GUARICHE". Intramuros (124). Archived from the original on 2015-05-21.
