= Monfils (surname) =

Monfils is a surname of French origin, meaning "my son." Notable people with the surname include:

- Daryl Monfils (born 1993), French tennis player
- Gaël Monfils (born 1986), French tennis player
- Michael Monfils (1938–2021), American mayor
- Nadine Monfils (born 1953), Belgian writer, film director and producer
- Philippe Monfils (born 1939), Belgian politician

== See also ==
- Bonfils
