= Robert Bonfils (French illustrator) =

French illustrator and designer (1886–1972)

- Born: Robert Etienne Bonfils; October 15, 1886; Paris, France
- Died: November 1, 1971 (aged 85); Paris, France
- Known for: Design; illustration; gravure; book binding
- Movement: Art deco

Robert Étienne Bonfils (1886–1972) was a French illustrator, painter and designer.

== Biography ==
Robert Bonfils was born in Paris on 15 October 1886. In 1903, he enrolled in the École Germain Pilon, in 1905 at the École Nationale Supérieure des Arts Décoratifs and between 1906 and 1909 at the École des Beaux Arts.

Starting from 1909, Bonfils regularly exposed at the Salon d'Automne and from 1912 onward at the Salon des Artistes Décorateurs, then at Tuileries and in most expositions of painting and the graphic arts, in France and abroad.

Bonfils was among the organisers of the 1925 International Exposition of Modern Industrial and Decorative Arts in Paris, while also participating in the organisation of the Exposition of 1937.

He created theatre sceneries starting from 1913, and since 1915 textile designs, which were manufactured by Bianchini. Since 1918, he also designed tapestries. He created many illustrations for books and publications, such as the work he did for Francis Jammes' novel Clara d'Ellébeuse, in 1913.

Bonfils was in charge of conférences at the École des Arts Décoratifs. For thirty-two years, he was a professor at the École Estienne where he had studied himself.

== Awards ==
Bonfils was created Chevalier de la Légion d'honneur in 1926, and Officier in 1938, by the French state.

== See also ==
- Art deco
