= Charlotte Perriand =

French architect and designer (1903–1999)

- Charlotte Perriand in 1954
- Born: Charlotte Perriand; 24 October 1903; Paris, France
- Died: 27 October 1999 (aged 96); Paris, France
- Education: École de L'Union Centrale des Arts Decoratifs
- Occupation: Architect
- Spouses: Percy Kilner Scholefield; Jacques Martin

Charlotte Perriand (French pronunciation: [ʃaʁlɔt peʁjɑ̃]; 24 October 1903 – 27 October 1999) was a French architect and furniture designer. Her work aimed to create functional living spaces in the belief that better design helps in creating a better society.

In her article "L'Art de Vivre" from 1981 she states "The extension of the art of dwelling is the art of living — living in harmony with man's deepest drives and with his adopted or fabricated environment." Charlotte liked to take her time in a space before starting the design process. In her autobiography, she states: "I like being alone when I visit a country or historic site. I like being bathed in its atmosphere, feeling in direct contact with the place without the intrusion of a third party." Her approach to design includes taking in the site and appreciating it for what it is.

== Early life ==
Perriand was born in Paris, France, to a tailor and a seamstress. Her high school art teacher noticed her drawing abilities early on, and her mother eventually encouraged her to enrol in the Central Union of Decorative Arts school (French: École de l'Union Centrale des Arts Décoratifs) in 1920 to study furniture design. One of her noted teachers during this period was Art Deco interior designer Henri Rapin. Perriand continued her education through attending department store classes that provided design workshops. She also went to lectures by Maurice Dufrêne, the studio director of workshop 'La Maîtrise'. In 1925, her projects from schoolwork were selected to be a part of the Exposition Internationale des Arts Décoratifs et Industriels Modernes. Dufrêne also put her wall-hanging designs on display at the Galeries Lafayette around this time.

== Career ==
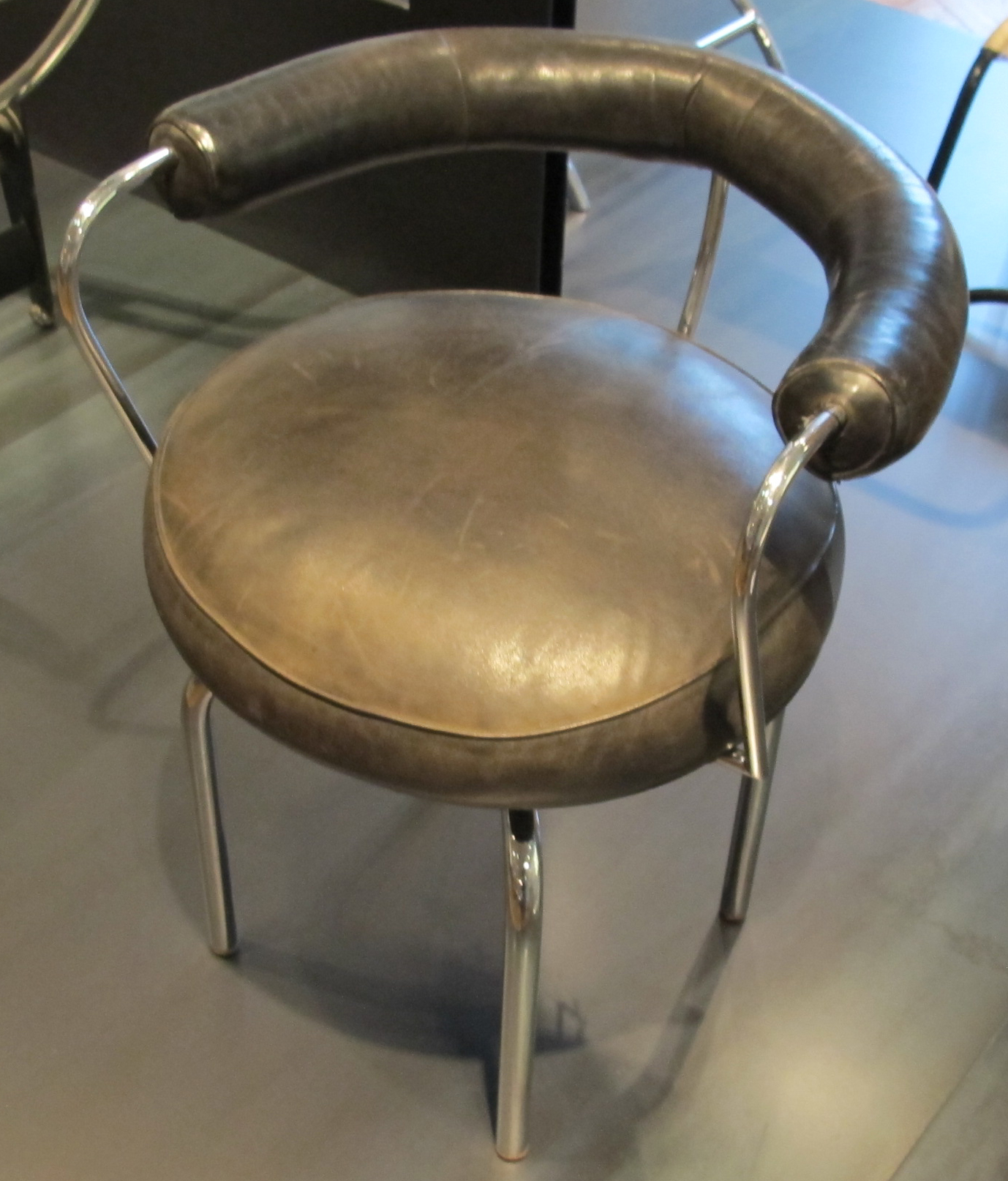
Siège pivotant (1927), Musée des Arts Décoratifs, Paris

Two years after graduating Perriand renovated her apartment into a room with a built-in wall bar made of aluminium, glass and chrome and a card table with built-in pool-pocket drink holders. She recreated this design as the Bar sous le Toit (Bar under the roof or Bar in the attic) at the 1927 Salon d'Automne. Her design featured an abundance of light-reflecting aluminium and nickel-plated surfaces, as well as leather cushions and glass shelves. Her design received wide praise from the press and established Perriand as a talent to watch.

The Bar sous le Toit showed her preference for designs that represented the machine age, a departure from the preference of the time for finely handcrafted objects made of rare woods.Perriand took advantage of the use of steel as a medium in this project, which formerly was used primarily by men.

Despite the success of the Bar sous le Toit, Perriand was not satisfied with creating designs just for the well-off; she wanted to work for Le Corbusier and pursue serial production and low-cost housing. She was inspired by his books, because she thought his writings that criticized the decorative arts aligned with the way she designed. When she applied to work at Le Corbusier's studio in October 1927, she was famously rejected with the reply "We don't embroider cushions here." A month later however, Le Corbusier visited the Bar sous le Toit at the Salon d'Automne, which convinced him to offer her a job in furniture design.

=== Work with Le Corbusier 1927–1937 ===
At Le Corbusier's studio she was in charge of their interiors work and promoting their designs through a series of exhibitions. Perriand described the work as being highly collaborative between Le Corbusier, Pierre Jeanneret (his cousin) and herself; they were "three fingers on one hand."

In 1928 she designed three chairs from Corbusier's principles that the chair was a "machine for sitting," and that each of the three would accommodate different positions for different tasks. At Corbusier's request, a chair was made for conversation: the B301 sling back chair; another for relaxation: the LC2 Grand Confort chair; and the last for sleeping: the B306 chaise longue. The chairs had tubular steel frames. In the prototype models, the steel was painted; in production the steel tubes were nickel- or chromium-plated.

In the 1930s Perriand's focus became more egalitarian and populist. Along with designing furniture and living spaces she was also involved with many leftist organizations, such as the Association des Écrivains et Artistes Révolutionnaires and Maison de la Culture. She also collaborated with the "Jeunes" in 1937 and helped to found the "Union des Artistes Modernes". In her designs from that period, rather than using chrome, which proved to be expensive, she began to use traditional materials such as wood and cane, which were more affordable. She also used some handcrafted techniques which she displayed at the 1935 Brussels International Exposition. Many of her designs from this period were inspired from the vernacular furniture of Savoie, where her paternal grandparents lived — a place she visited often as a child.

After working with Le Corbusier for a decade she "stepped out of his shadow into a successful career of her own."

=== Japan and Vietnam 1940–1946 ===
After finishing her work with Le Corbusier she worked with Jean Prouvé. She designed metal objects, like screens and stair railings. The war turned their focus to designing military barracks and furnishings for temporary housing. In 1940 France surrendered, and they parted ways until 1951. Perriand left France to go to Japan when the Germans arrived to occupy Paris in 1940. She travelled to Japan as an official advisor for industrial design to the Ministry for Trade and Industry. While in Japan she advised the government on raising the standards of design in Japanese industry to develop products for the West. On her way back to Europe she was detained and forced into Vietnamese exile because of the war. Throughout her exile, she studied woodwork and weaving and also gained much influence from Eastern design. The Book of Tea which she read at this time also had a major impact on her work and she referenced it throughout the rest of her career.

In the period after World War II (1939–45) there was increased interest in using new methods and materials for mass production of furniture. Manufacturers of materials such as formica, plywood, aluminum, and steel sponsored the salons of the Société des artistes décorateurs. Designers who exhibited their experimental work at the salons in this period included Perriand, Pierre Guariche, René-Jean Caillette, Jean Prouvé, Joseph-André Motte, Antoine Philippon and Jacqueline Lecoq.

=== Return to Paris 1946–1966 ===
Charlotte Perriand's work was in high demand and she worked on many projects from ski resorts to student housing. She often refused to furnish buildings designed by other architects. However, she was eager to work with Jean Prouvé again, who collaborated with her on and produced several of her designs from 1951 to 1953. She also designed the interiors and kitchens for the famous Unité d'habitation.

Some of her work at that particular period of time includes:

- The Méribel ski resort
- The League of Nations building for the United Nations in Geneva
- The remodelling of Air France's offices in London, Paris and Tokyo

=== Les Arcs 1967–1982 ===
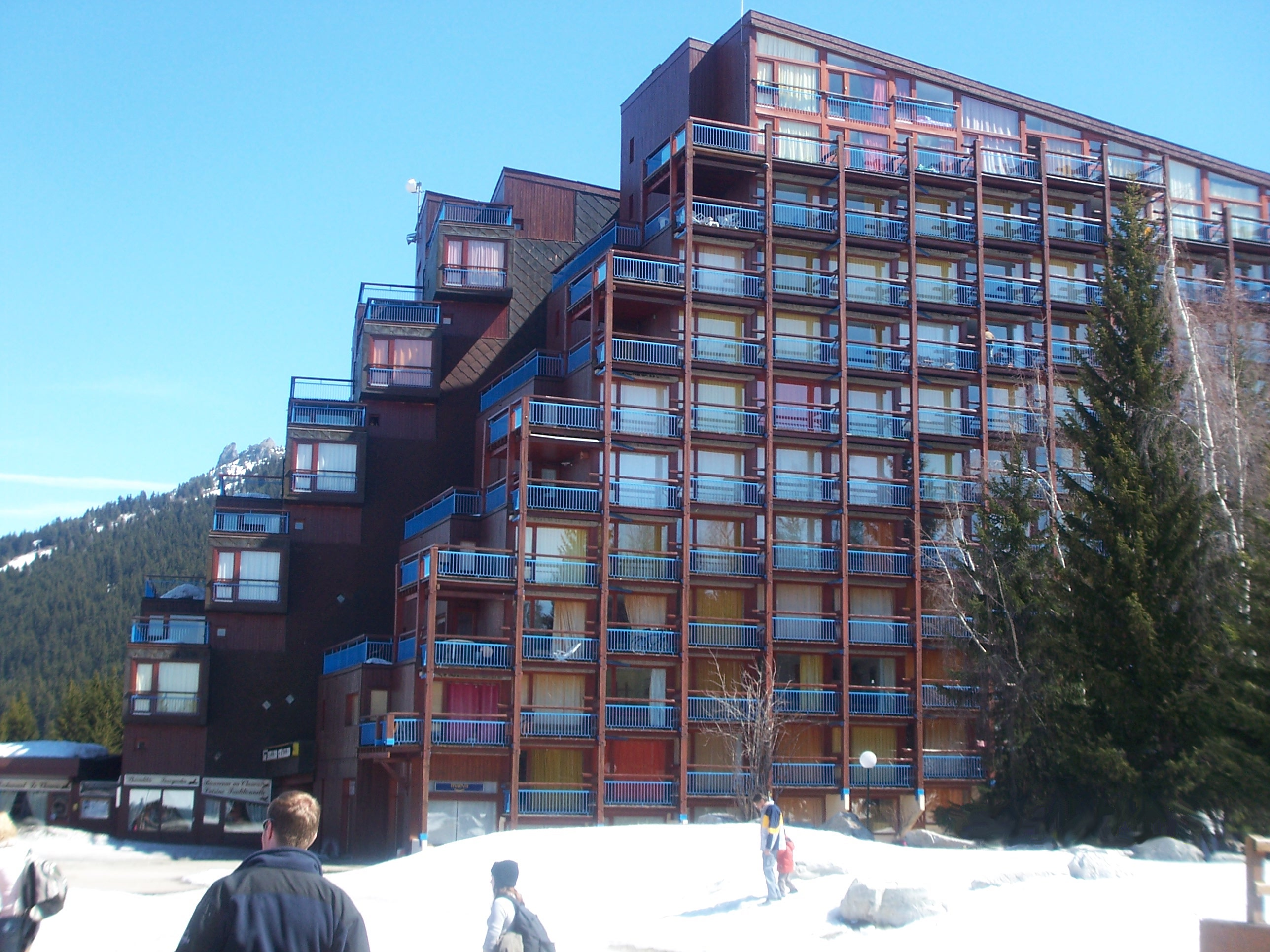
Les Arcs 1800

The ski resorts at Les Arcs in Savoie combined Perriand's interests in prefabrication, standardization, industrialization and mountain architecture, and has been called the climax of her career. Perriand herself was a passionate skier and took on the Les Arcs project following her work on the Méribel ski resort. The Les Arcs resort was designed for middle class guests. Built in several stages, the resort now has 28,000 units. The developer of the resort was Michel Rocard, other designers and architects who worked on the Les Arcs resort include Gaston Regairaz, Guy Rey-Millet, Robert Rebutato, Bernard Taillefer, Alain Taves, and Pierre Faucheux. In 1969 the first apartment buildings had been completed. A further three apartment blocks were completed between 1969 and 1976.

Since guests would spend most of their time outdoors, Perriand designed minimal rooms, the minimal cell style being a hallmark of her design. Instead the buildings have great spaces that are open to the nature and the elements. Importantly standardization of the wet units (bathrooms and kitchens) increased efficiency and allowed them to build 500 inhabitable studios very quickly.

== The Chaise Longue ==
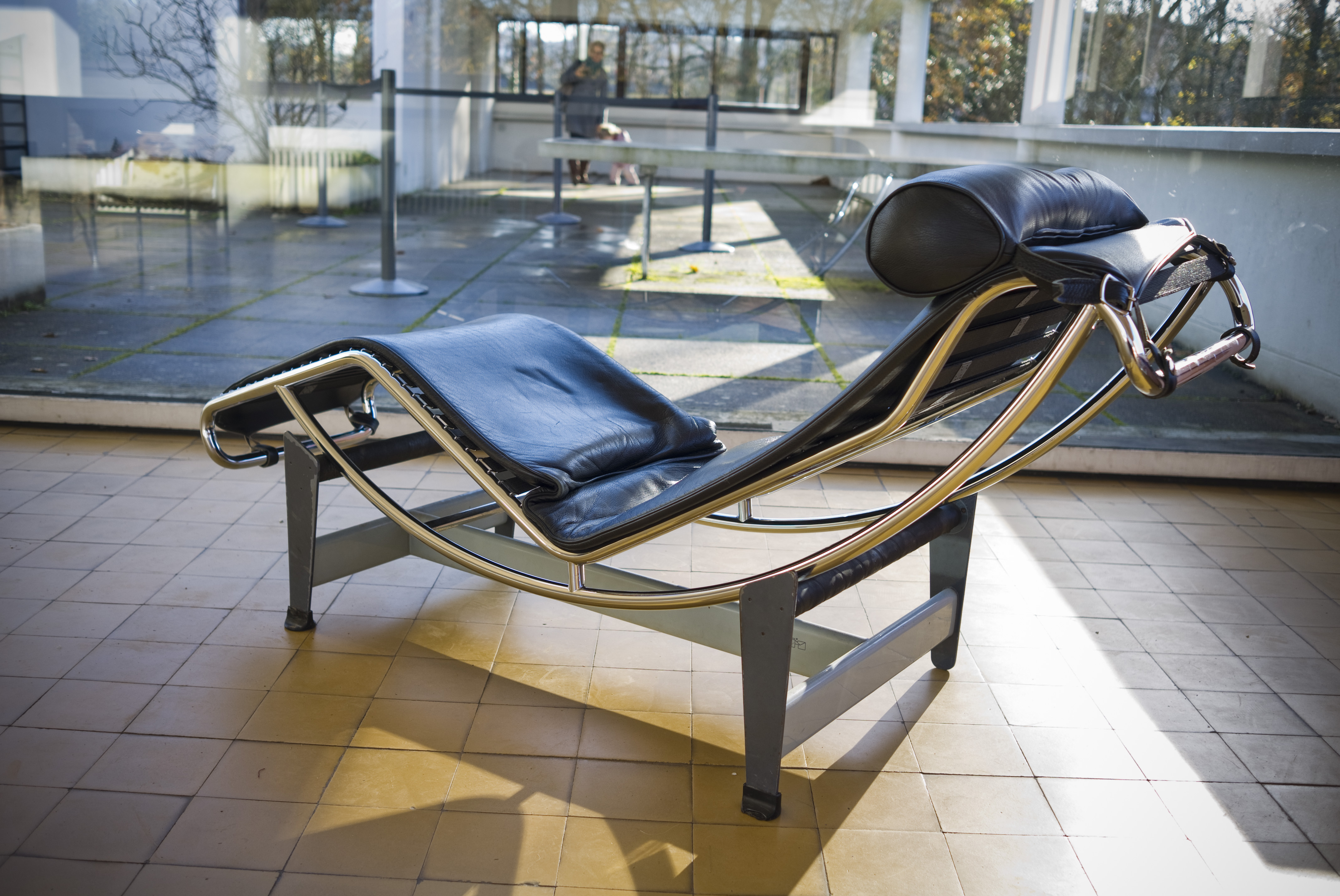
Chaise Longue (1928) by Charlotte Perriand and Le Corbusier

Perriand was familiar with Thonet's bentwood chairs and used them often not only for inspiration but also in her designs. Their chaise longue, for this reason, bears some similarity to Thonet's bentwood rocker although it doesn't appear to rock when sitting on the 4-legged base. But when the chaise is removed from the base and set on a flat surface, it rocks very smoothly. The chair has double tubing at the sides and a lacquered sheet metal base. The legs unintentionally resemble horse hooves. Perriand took this and ran with it, finding pony skin from Parisian furriers to cover the chaise.

Perriand wrote in a memoir: "While our chair designs were directly related to the position of the human body...they were also determined by the requirements of architecture, setting, and prestige". With a chair that reflects the human body (thin frame, cushion/head) and has decorative qualities (fabrication, structural qualities) they accomplished this goal. It wasn't instantly popular due to its formal simplicity, but as modernism rose, so did the chair's popularity.

== Personal life ==
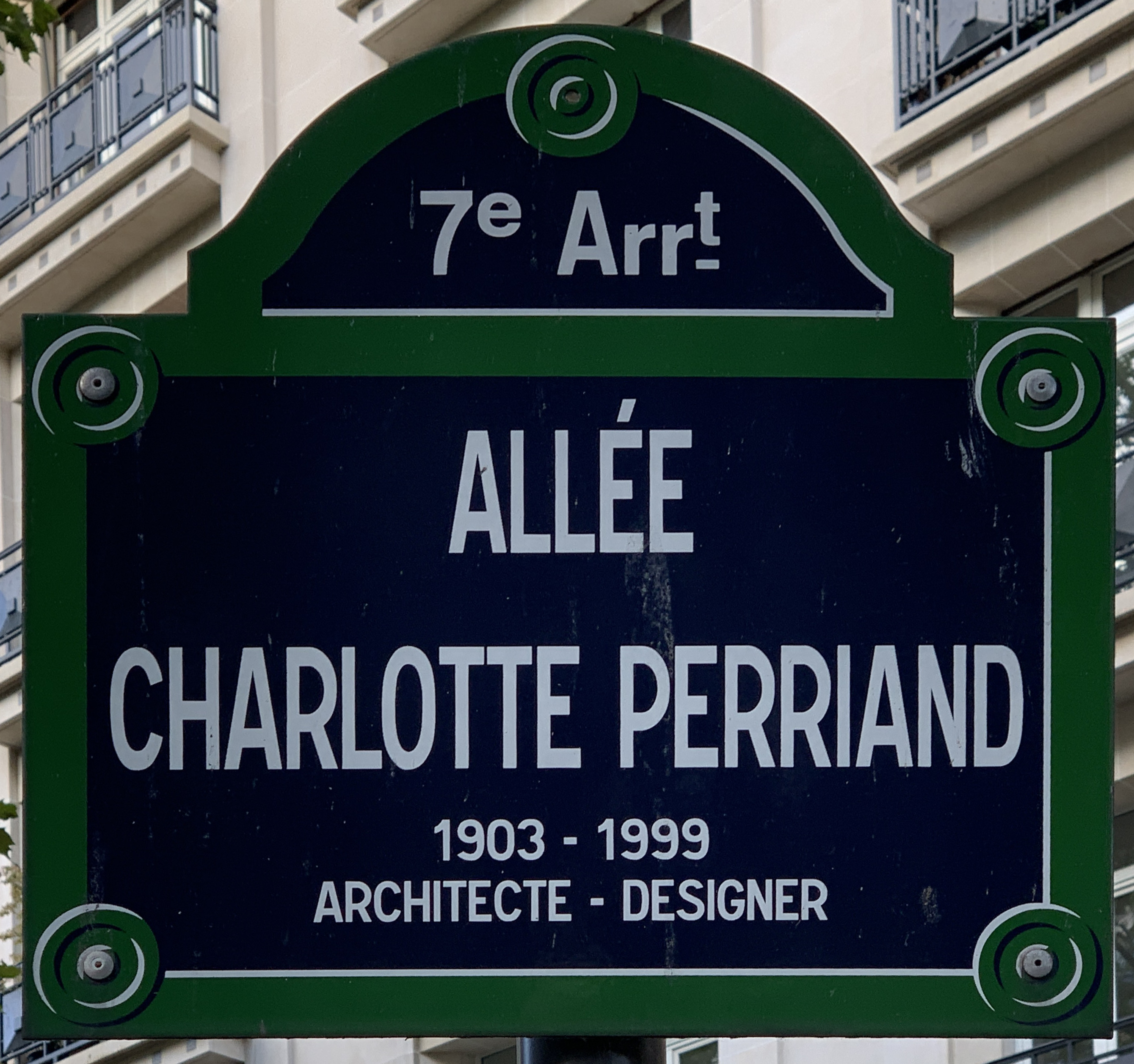
Allée Charlotte Perriand in Paris

In 1926 Perriand married her first husband, Percy Kilner Scholefield, and they converted their attic apartment into a 'machine age' interior. In 1930 Charlotte and Percy separated and she moved to Montparnasse. Her daughter with her second husband, Jacques Martin, was named Pernette Perriand and was born in 1944; she worked alongside her mother for over 25 years.

Charlotte died three days after her 96th birthday in 1999.

== Timeline ==
- 1927 Is interviewed by Le Corbusier on an October afternoon. After a brief glance at her drawings she is rejected and Le Corbusier bids her farewell with the dry comment "We don't embroider cushions here." She leaves her card with him regardless, and later that year invites Le Corbusier to see her installation at the Bar sous le Toit filled with tubular steel furniture at the Salon d'Automne. Her exhibition impresses him, resulting in an invitation by Le Corbusier to join his studio at 35, rue de Sèvres to design furniture and interiors for him.
- 1928 Designs three chairs with Le Corbusier and Pierre Jeanneret (the LC2 Grand Confort armchair, the B301 reclining chair and the B306 chaise longue) for the studio's architectural projects.
- 1929 Creates a model modern apartment in glass and tubular steel to be exhibited as Équipement d'Habitation (=Living Equipment) at the Salon d'Automne.
- 1930 Travels to Moscow for a Congrès International d'Architecture Moderne (CIAM) conference and designs fixtures for the Pavilion Suisse at the Cité Universitaire in Paris.
- 1932 Starts work on the Salvation Army headquarters project in Paris.
- 1933 Travels to Moscow again and also Athens to participate in CIAM conferences.
- 1934 Designs the furniture and interior fixtures for Le Corbusier's new apartment on the Rue Nungesser-et-Coli.
- 1937 Leaves Le Corbusier's studio to collaborate with the cubist painter Fernand Léger on a pavilion for the 1937 Paris Exhibition and to work on a ski resort in Savoie.
- 1939 When the Second World War begins, she leaves the Savoie region to return to Paris and to design prefabricated buildings with Jean Prouvé and Pierre Jeanneret.
- 1940 Sails for Japan, where she had been appointed as an advisor on industrial design to the Ministry of Trade and Industry.
- 1942 Forced to leave Japan as an "undesirable alien", but is trapped by the naval blockade and spends the rest of the war in Vietnam, where she marries her second husband, Jacques Martin, and gives birth to a daughter, Pernette, in 1944.
- 1946 Returns to France and revives her career as an independent designer and her collaboration with Jean Prouvé.
- 1947 Works with Fernand Léger on the design of Hôpital Saint-Lo.
- 1950 Designs a prototype kitchen for Le Corbusier's Unité d'Habitation apartment building in Marseille.
- 1951 Organised the French section of the Triennale di Milano in Milan.
- 1953 Collaborates on design of the Hotel de France in Conakry, Guinea.
- 1957 Designs the League of Nations building for the United Nations in Geneva.
- 1959 Works with Le Corbusier and the Brazilian architect Lucio Costa on the interior of their Maison du Brésil at the Cité Universitaire in Paris.
- 1960 Collaborates with Ernő Goldfinger on the design of the French Tourist Office on London's Piccadilly.
- 1962 Begins a long-running project to design a series of ski resorts in Savoie.
- 1978 Commissioned to design unique furniture pieces for architect Pierre Debeaux's Maison Pradier in Lavaur, France. These pieces were sold at Sotheby's in 2020.
- 1985 Retrospective of her work at the Musée des Arts Décoratifs in Paris.
- 1998 Publication of her autobiography, Une Vie de Création, and presentation of a retrospective at the Design Museum in London.
- 1999 Dies in Paris at age 96.
- 2021 Exhibited in the Design Museum, London, as "Charlotte Perriand: The Modern Life"
- 2022 Charlotte Perriand award is founded by The Créateurs Design Association & Awards. This is the first time her family has allowed her name to be used beyond her own work.

== Gallery ==
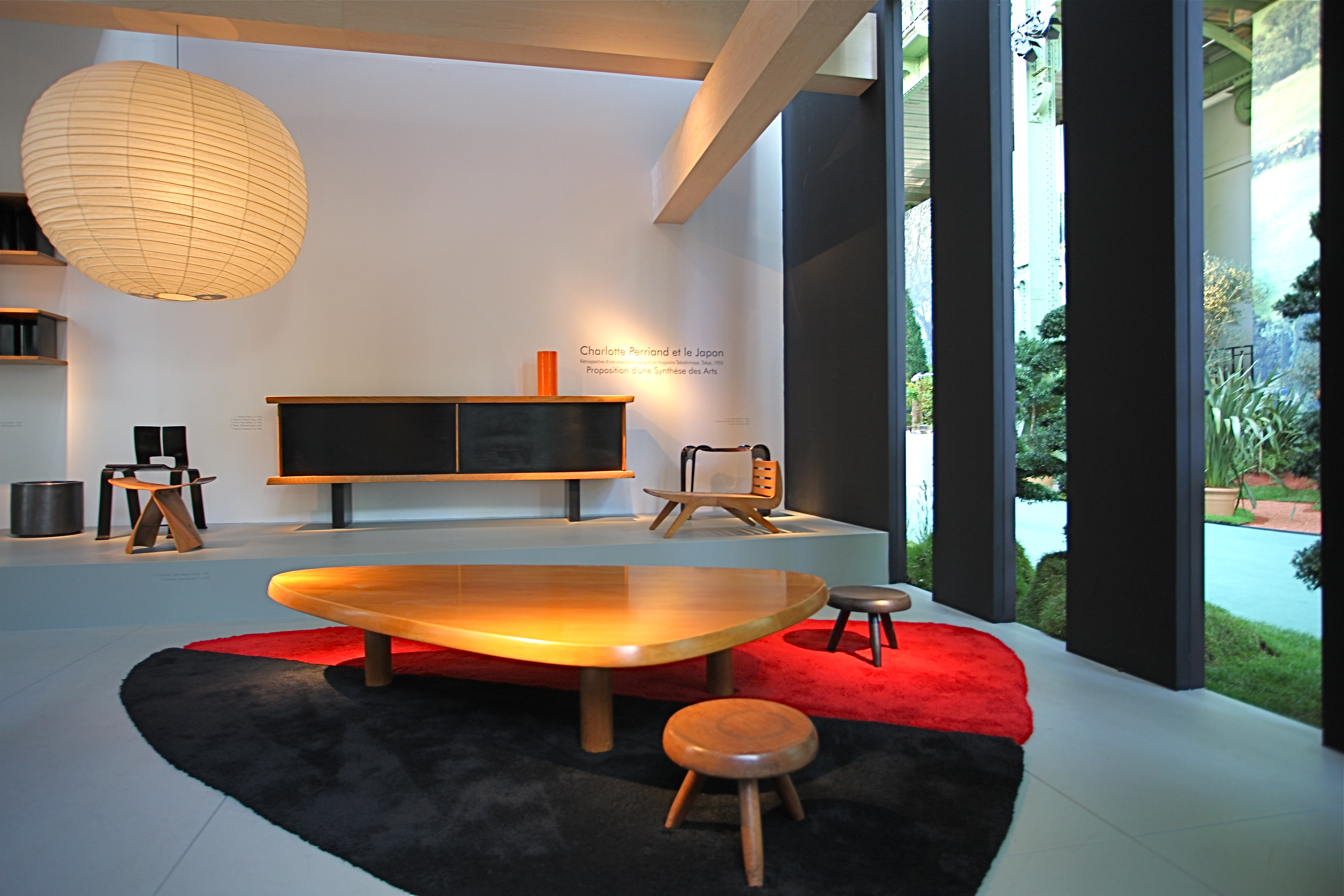
Interior Design (furniture) of Charlotte Perriand

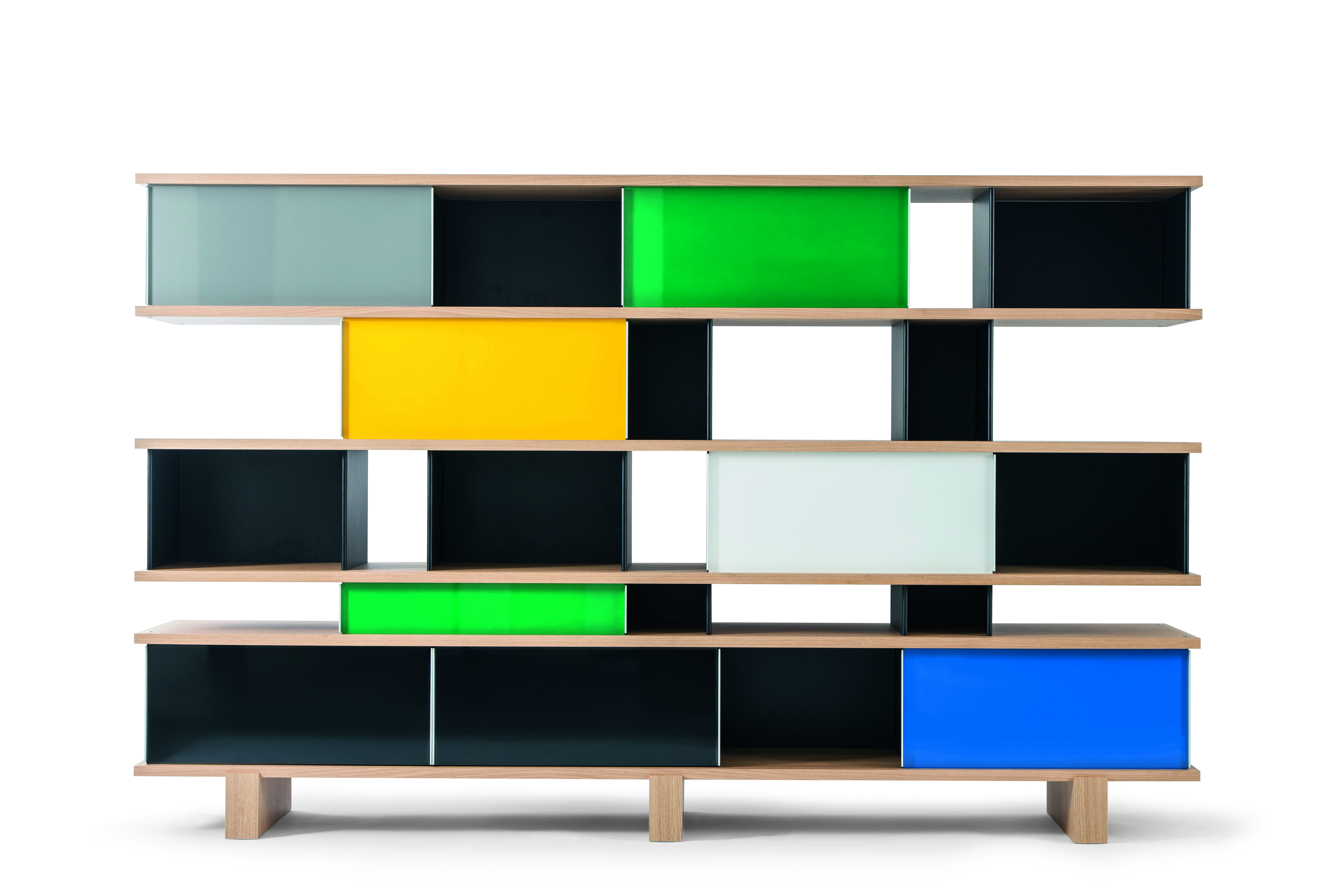
Nuage bookcase (manufactured by Cassina)

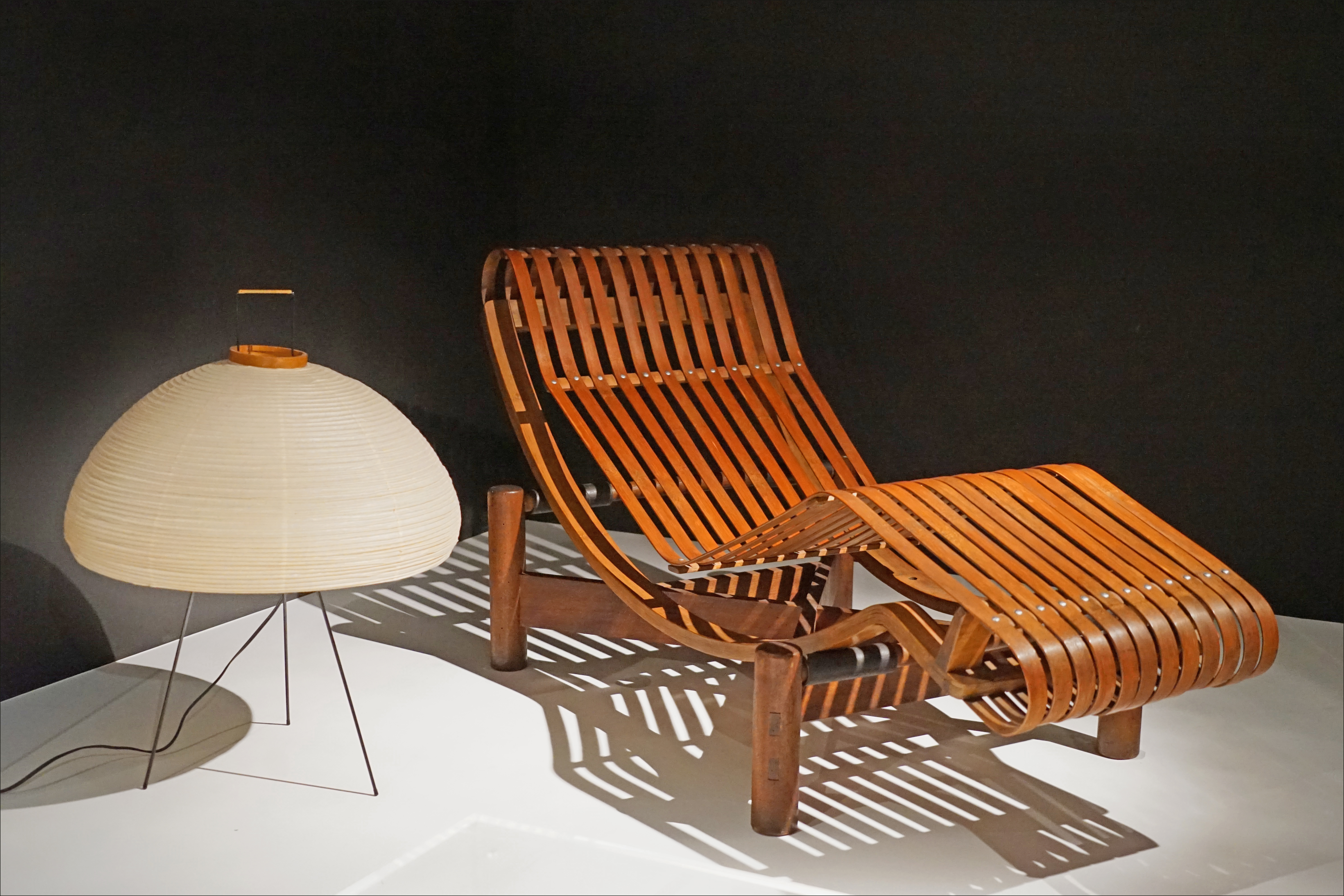
Tokyo Chaise longue (with Akari 10A lamp by Isamu Noguchi)

== Bibliography ==
- Charlotte Perriand by Elisabeth Vedrenne. Assouline, November 2005. ISBN 2-84323-661-4.
- Charlotte Perriand: A Life of Creation by Charlotte Perriand. Monacelli, November 2003. ISBN 1-58093-074-3.
- Charlotte Perriand: An Art of Living by Mary McLeod. Harry N. Abrams, Inc., December 2003. ISBN 0-8109-4503-7.
- Charlotte Perriand and Photography: A Wide-Angle Eye by Jacques Barsac. Five Continents, February 2011. ISBN 978-88-7439-548-4.
- Charlotte Perriand: Livre de Bord by Arthur Rüegg. Basel: Birkhäuser (Princeton Architectural Press); first edition, December 2004. ISBN 3-7643-7037-8.
- Charlotte Perriand: Modernist Pioneer by Charlotte Benton. Design Museum, October 1996. ISBN 1-872005-99-3.
- Charlotte Perriand: Un Art D'Habiter, 1903–1959 by Jacques Barsac. Norma Editions, 2005. ISBN 978-2-909283-87-6.
- Die Liege LC4 von Le Corbusier, Pierre Jeanneret und Charlotte Perriand (Design-Klassiker) by Volker Fischer. Basel: Birkhäuser. ISBN 3-7643-6820-9.
- From Tubular Steel to Bamboo: Charlotte Perriand, the Migrating Chaise-longue and Japan by Charlotte Benton. Journal of Design History VOL.11, No.1 (1998).
- Hinchman, Mark: History of Furniture. New York: Fairchild Books, 2009. pp. 493–496. Print.
- Barsac, Jacques. Charlotte Perriand: Complete Works. Volume 1: 1903–1940. Paris: Archives Charlotte Perriand; Zurich, Switzerland: Scheidegger & Spiess, 2014–2017. ISBN 9783858817464.
- Barsac, Jacques: Charlotte Perriand: Complete Works. Volume 2: 1940–1955. Zurich: Scheidegger & Spiess, 2015. ISBN 978-3-85881-747-1.
- Barsac, Jacques. Charlotte Perriand: Complete Works. Volume 3: 1956–1968. Paris: Archives Charlotte Perriand; Zurich, Switzerland: Scheidegger & Spiess, 2014–2017. ISBN 9783858817488.
- Barsac, Jacques. Charlotte Perriand: Complete Works. Volume 4: 191968-1999. Paris: Archives Charlotte Perriand; Zurich, Switzerland: Scheidegger & Spiess, 2014–2017. ISBN 978-3-85881-778-5.
- Croft, Catherine. “An Impressive Survey of a Once Underestimated Figure – Charlotte Perriand: Inventing a New World [’Le Monde Nouveau de Charlotte Perriand’], Fondation Louis Vuitton, Paris.” C20: The Magazine of the Twentieth Century Society, no. 1 (January 1, 2020): 58.
- Prat-Couadau, Nathalie and Deke Dusinberee. Living with Charlotte Perriand. Paris: Skira, 2019. ISBN 9782370741042.
- Antonio Stefanelli. 2020. “The Art of Daily Life Objects Charlotte Perriand and Clara Porset Dialogue with Tradition.” Pad 13 (18): 196–214.
