= Société des artistes décorateurs =

Societé des artistes décorateurs
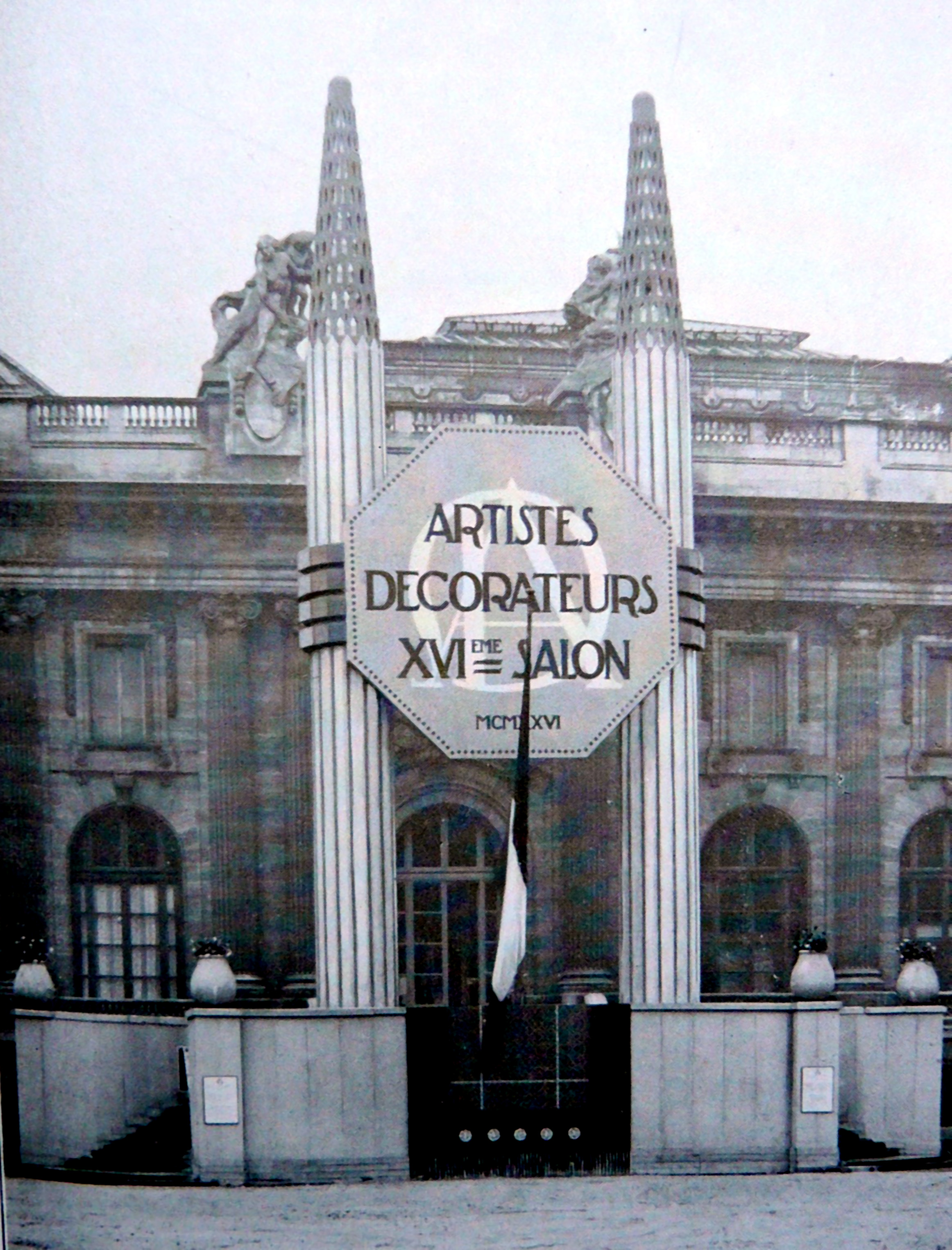
- Grand Palais 1926 Salon of the SAD
- Abbreviation: SAD
- Formation: 1901
- Legal status: Defunct
- Purpose: Encourage design and decorative arts
- Headquarters: Grand-Palais Porte C Avenue Franklin Roosevelt 75008 Paris 08
- Location: Paris, France
- Region served: France

The Societé des artistes décorateurs (SAD, Society of Decorative Artists) was a French society of designers of furniture, interiors and decorative arts that was active from 1901 until the 2000s. It sponsored an annual Salon des artistes décorateurs in which its members could display their new work.

== History ==
Some historians trace Art Deco's roots to the Universal Exposition of 1900. After this show a group of artists established an informal collective known as La Société des artistes décorateurs to promote French crafts. Among them were Hector Guimard, Eugène Grasset, Raoul Lachenal, Paul Bellot, Maurice Dufrêne and Émile Decoeur. These artists are said to have influenced the principles of Art Deco.

The Société des artistes décorateurs (SAD) was founded in 1901 in response to increasing interest in France in fine and applied arts. It was aimed to satisfy the demand of the prosperous urban elite for high-quality French craftsmanship and cabinetmaking. The society's salons were the first official means of encouraging new standards for design and production in France. Francis Jourdain, son of the architect Frantz Jourdain, was a regular exhibitor from 1913–28 at the Salon d'Automne and the SAD. Jourdain published many articles on modern art and aesthetics in which he attacked the ostentatious luxury that was typical of contemporary French design. His own designs were simple, with straightforward construction.

In 1912 the French government decided to sponsor an international exhibition of decorative arts to highlight French design excellence, to be held in 1915. The plans were disrupted by World War I (1914–18) and the exhibition was not held until 1925. At the 1925 Exposition Internationale des Arts Décoratifs et Industriels Modernes (International Exposition of Modern Industrial and Decorative Arts) Jourdain's "Physical Culture Room", unlike other exhibits, did not emphasize luxury living. His design used smooth wood paneling on the walls and ceilings that resembled riveted sheets of metal.

By the 1950s the society's salons were one of the main places for young designers to exhibit their new work. In the period after World War II (1939–45) there was increased interest in using new methods and materials for mass production of furniture. Manufacturers of materials such as formica, plywood, aluminum, and steel sponsored the salons. Designers who exhibited their experimental work in this period included Pierre Guariche, Joseph André Motte, René Jean Caillette, Jean Prouvé, Charlotte Perriand, Antoine Philippon and Jacqueline Lecoq. The salons also showed decorated textile and ceramic art.

== Founders and presidents ==
Founding members were René Guilleré, Hector Guimard, Eugène Gaillard, Eugène Grasset, Maurice Dufrêne and Paul Follot.

Presidents of the SAD:

- 1903–04: Guillaume Dubufe
- 1905–10: Émile Séraphin Vernier
- 1911: René Guilleré
- 1912: Henri Marcel
- 1913–23: Paul Vitry
- 1923: Maurice Bokanowski
- 1933: André Tardieu
- 1939: Louis Süe
- 1940–42: Auguste Perret
- 1943–45: André Domin
- 1945–47: René Gabriel
- 1948–49: Jacques Adnet
- 1950–53: Raymond Subes
- 1954–57: André Renou
- 1958–61: Etienne-Henri Martin
- 1966–68: Joseph-André Motte
- 1974–77: Jean Louis Berthet
- 1980–2008: Jean-Pierre Khalifa

== Sources ==
- Campbell, Gordon (2006-11-09). The Grove Encyclopedia of Decorative Arts. Oxford University Press. ISBN 978-0-19-518948-3.
- Duncan, Alastair (1988). Encyclopedia of Art Deco. Headline Book Publishing. ISBN 978-0-7472-0083-3.
- Heilbrunn Timeline of Art History (2015). "French Art Deco". The Metropolitan Museum of Art.
- "Les Salon des Artistes Décorateurs". Demisch Danant. 2010-10-20. Archived from the original on 2015-04-11.
- Raizman, David (2003). History of Modern Design: Graphics and Products Since the Industrial Revolution. Laurence King Publishing. ISBN 978-1-85669-348-6.
- "Société des Artistes Décorateurs". Oxford Dictionary of Modern Design – via Answers.com.
