= René-Jean Caillette =

French decorative artist and designer

- Born: 1919; Fay-aux-Loges, France
- Died: 2005 (aged 85–86); Paris, France
- Occupations: Decorative artist, designer
- Known for: Diamond chair

René-Jean Caillette (1919–2005) was a French decorative artist and designer, son of a cabinetmaker. His elegant and modernistic furniture designs were mass-produced after World War II (1939–45). His molded plywood Diamond chair is considered a classic.

== Life ==
René-Jean Caillette was born in 1919, the son of a cabinetmaker. He followed his father's trade, creating furniture designs that were functional and visually simple. In the period after World War II (1939–45) there was increased interest in using new methods and materials for mass production of furniture. Manufacturers of materials such as formica, plywood, aluminum, and steel sponsored the salons of the Société des artistes décorateurs. Designers who exhibited their experimental work at the salons in this period included Caillette, Pierre Guariche, Joseph André Motte, Jean Prouvé, Charlotte Perriand, Antoine Philippon and Jacqueline Lecoq.

In 1950 Caillette's work was discovered by George Charron, a major French furniture manufacturer. Caillette collaborated as a designer with Alain Richard, Genevieve Dangles and Joseph-André Motte, who called themselves "Group 4". They created simple designs using materials such as plywood, plastic, rattan, and formica to create affordable modernist designs for mass production. In 1952 Caillette was awarded the René Gabriel prize, and in 1962 won the silver medal at the Milan Triennale. He designed furniture for Charron until 1972. Cailette died in 2005. He bequeathed his estate to a charity.

== Designs ==
Caillette was rigorous in his approach to developing and prototyping designs. He was always committed to simplicity of line, and was innovative in use of materials. Caillette remained fond of wood. He said, "I am the son of a cabinetmaker, and I still remember the smell of wood shavings in the workshop of my father." He said, "I consider design to be wanted, determined, thoughtful, and assertive." His 1958 Diamond chair was manufactured by Steiner. Caillette said of this signature design, "It is the most pure and the most easy to fabricate of my models in molded plywood. I designed it with a piece of cardboard, telling myself that if the cardboard could fold, then so could wood." The Diamond chair has been called an icon of French modernism. It was awarded the gold medal at the 1958 international EXPO in Brussels.

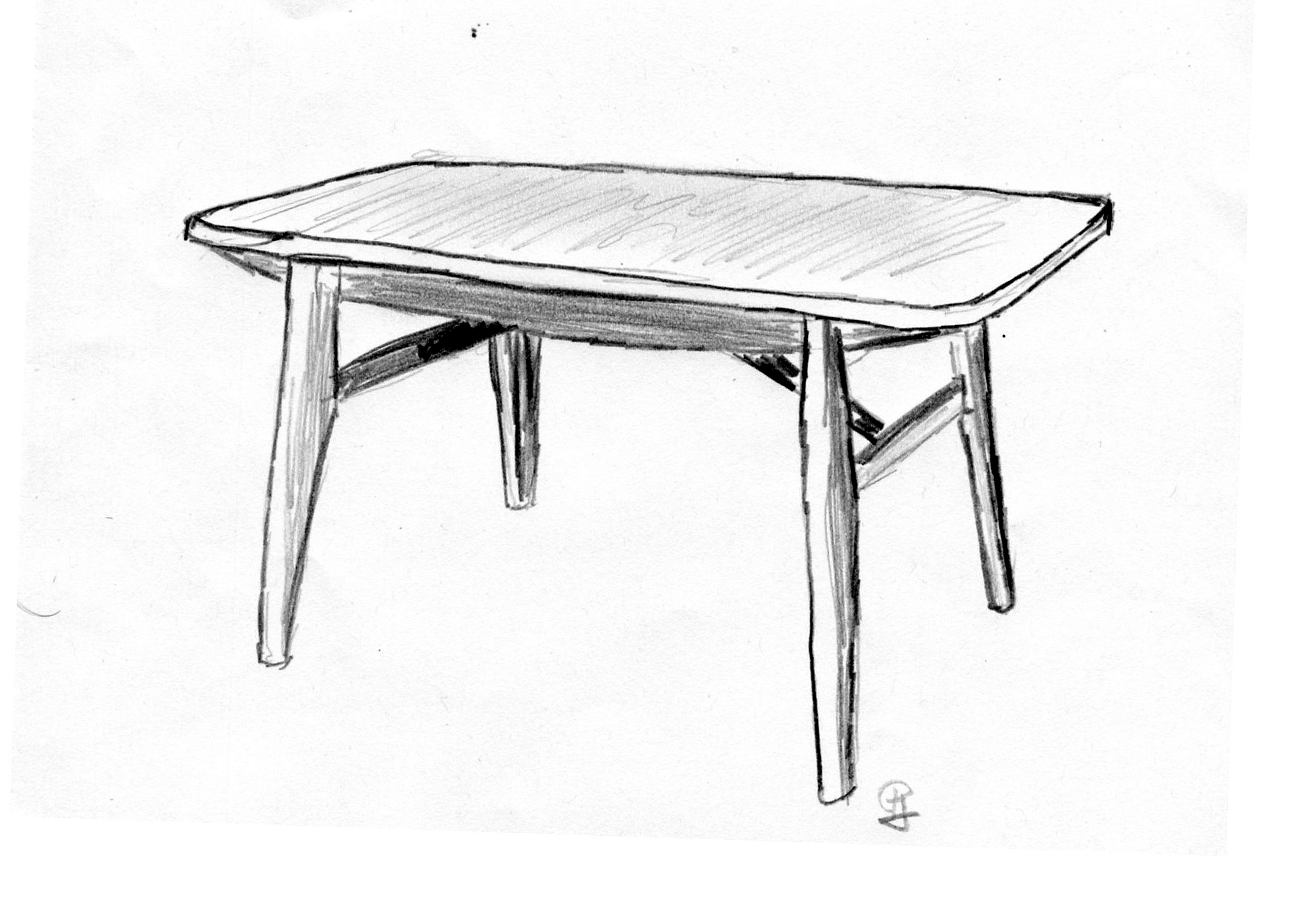
Dining table, 1950

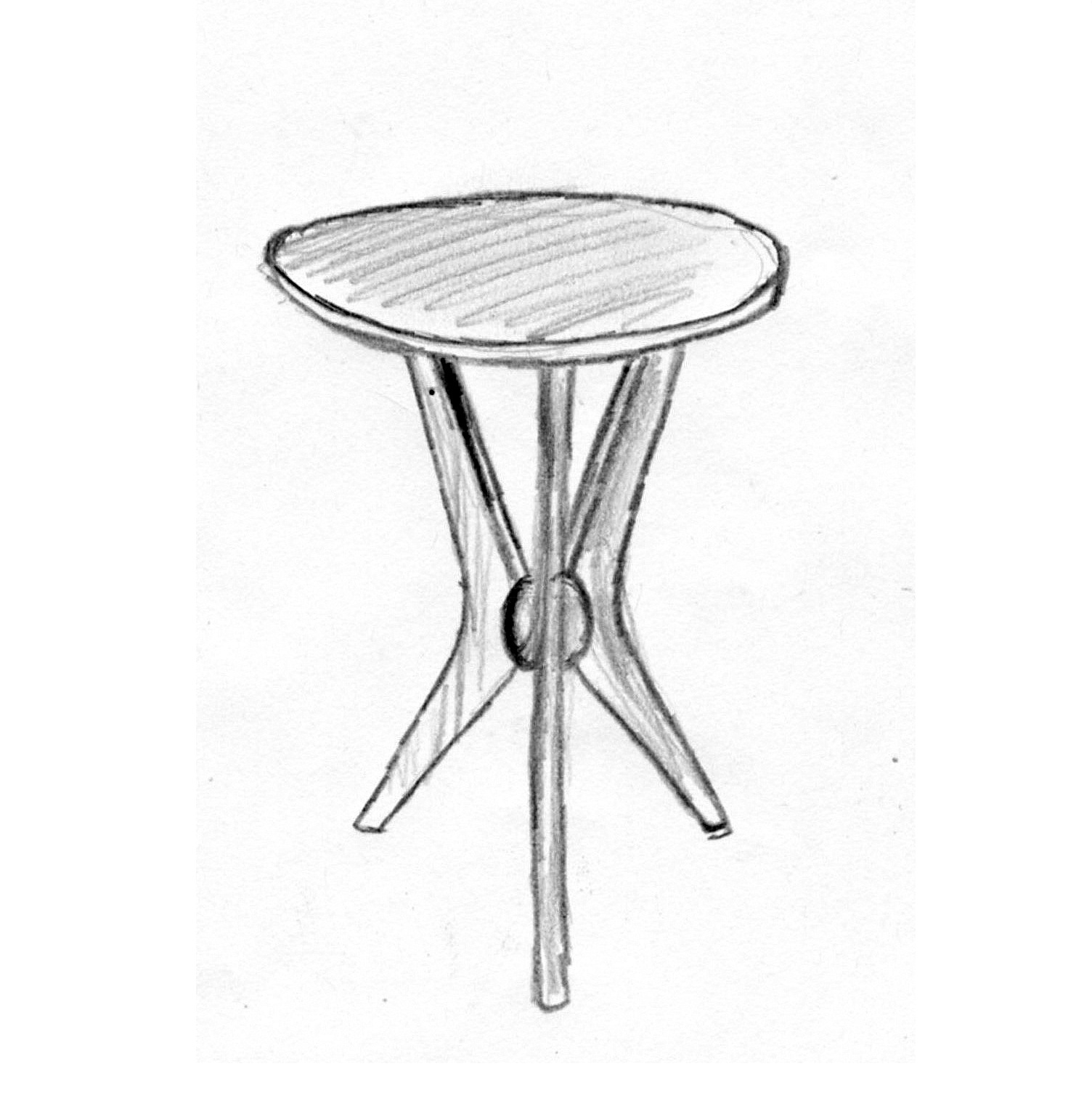
Side table, 1950

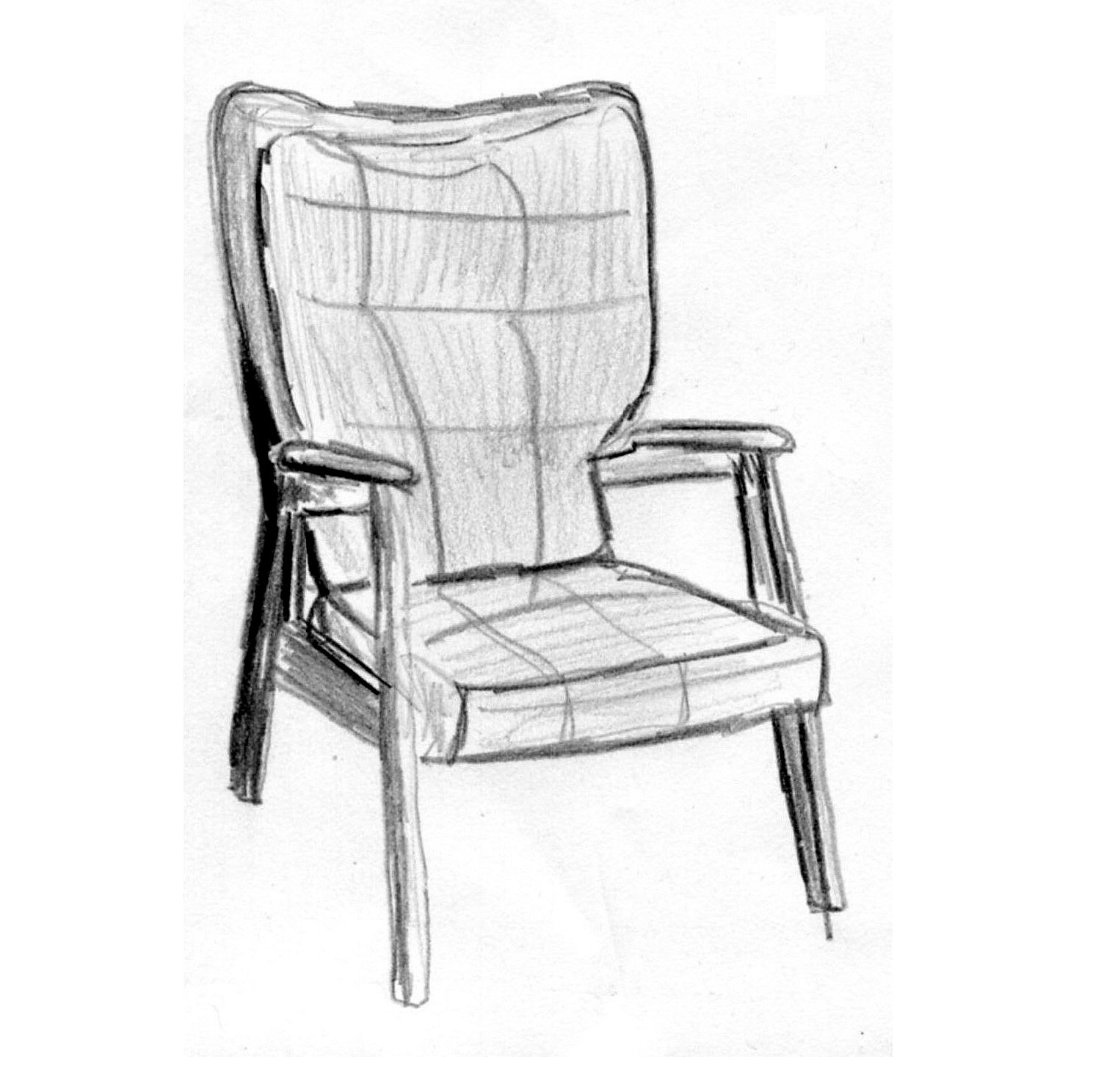
Armchair, 1951

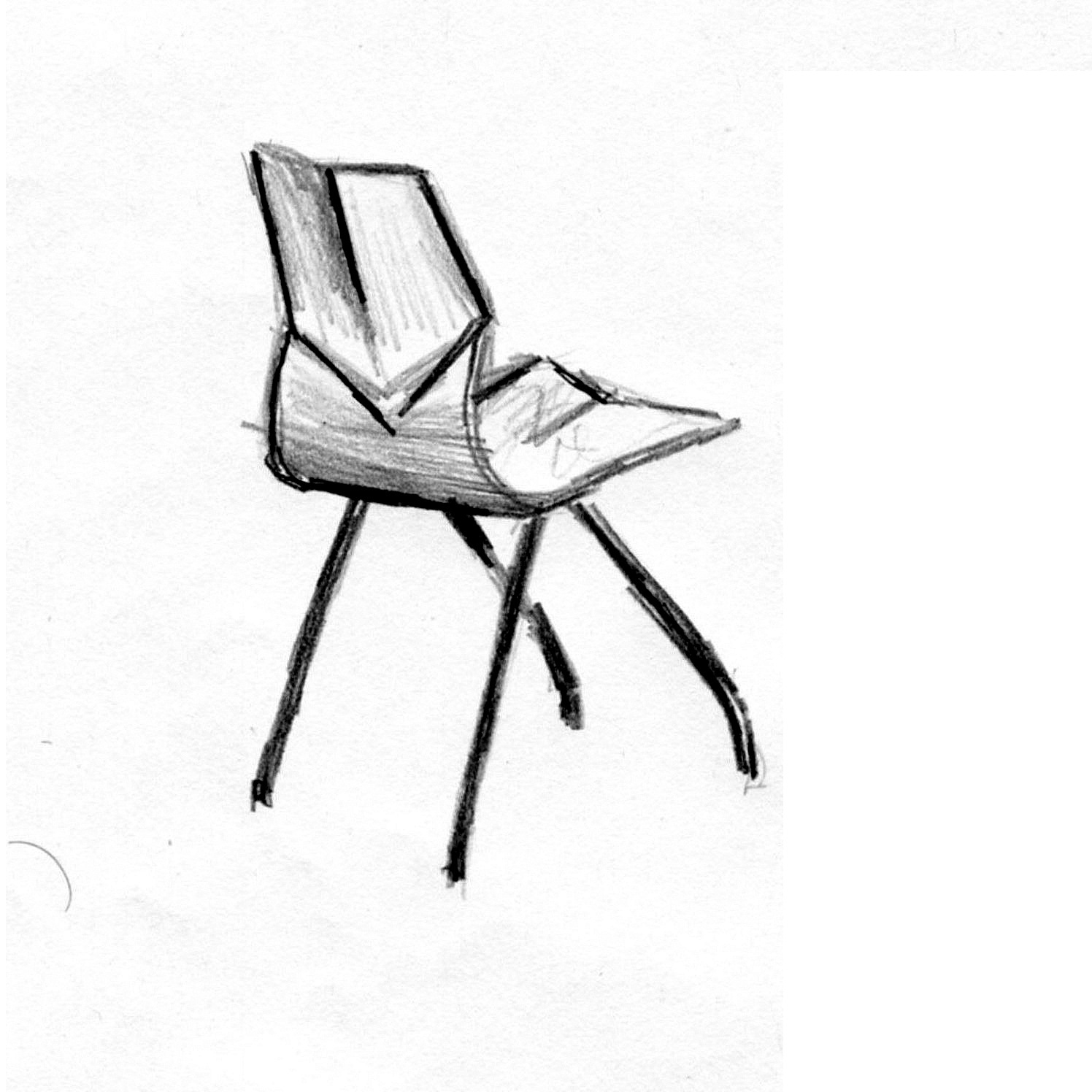
Diamond chair, 1957

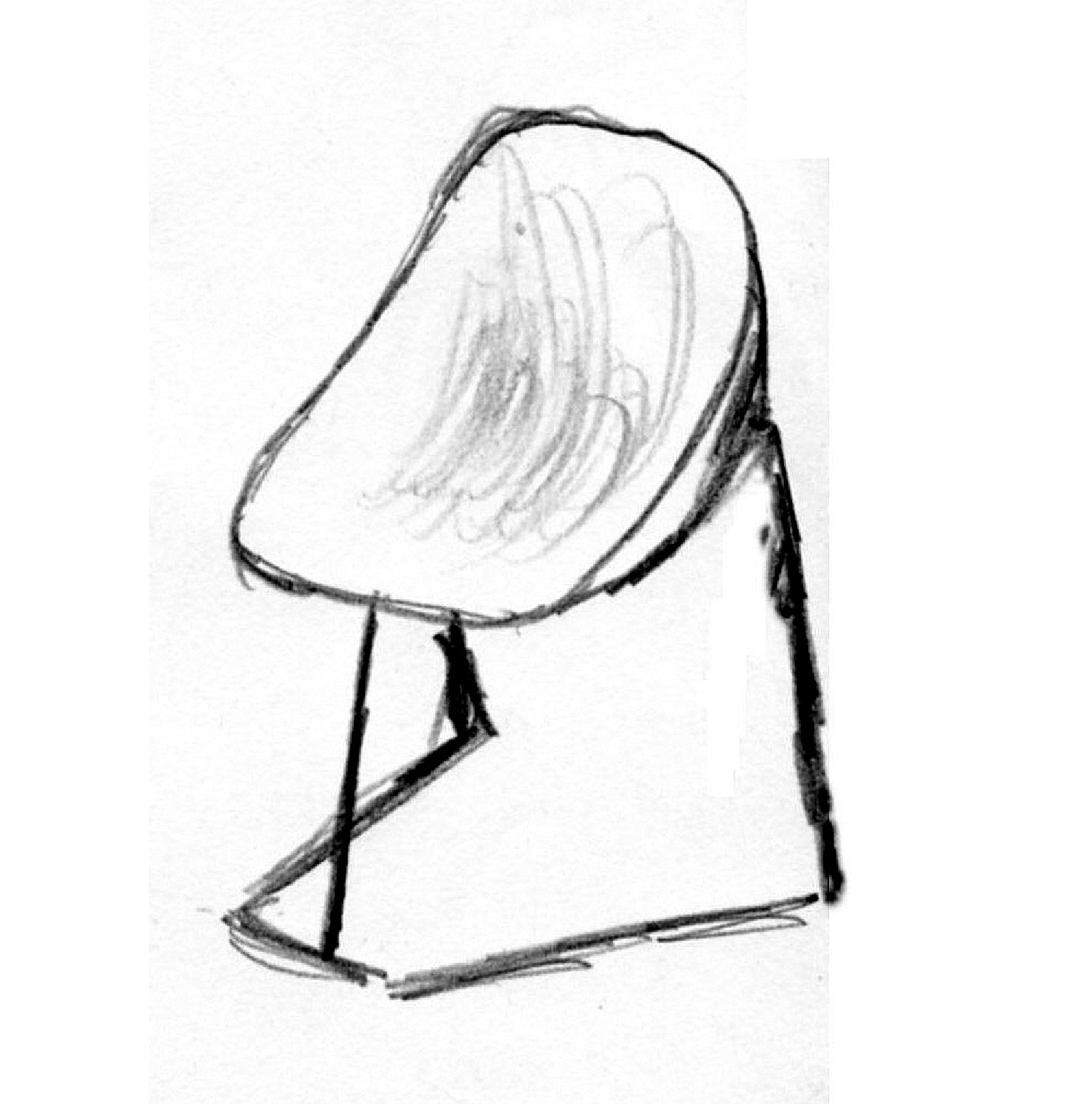
Ladybug chair, 1957

== Publications ==
- Caillette, René-Jean; Vauvillier, Maryse; Pajot, Anne-Marie (1972). J'arrange et j'aménage. J. Tallandier. p. 310.
- Mortier, Michel; Pajot, Anne-Marie; Caillette, René-Jean (1971). Soyez décoratrice... J. Tallandier. p. 310.
- Caillette, René Jean (1978). Décor et bien-être. Larousse. p. 191. ISBN 978-2-03-001205-5.

== Sources ==
- "Caillette, René-Jean (1919 - 2005)". The Red List.
- "Les Salon des Artistes Décorateurs". Demisch Danant. 2010-10-20. Archived from the original on 2015-04-11.
- "Rare Design from René-Jean Caillette, Postwar Master of Clean Lines and Modern Materials" (PDF). Artsy.
- "René-Jean Caillette". Artsy.
- "René-Jean Caillette". Demische Danant.
- "René Jean Caillette". Wall Street International.
