= Salon des arts ménagers =

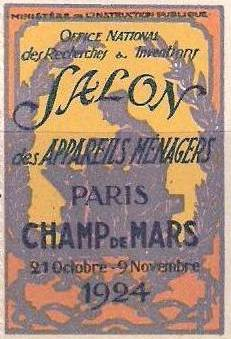
- Poster for the 1924 Salon des Appareils Ménagers
- Abbreviation: SAM
- Formation: 1923
- Dissolved: 1983
- Type: Annual exhibition
- Legal status: Defunct
- Purpose: Display new home appliances and furniture
- Location: Paris, France
- Official language: French
- Main organ: L’Art Ménager

The Salon des arts ménagers (SAM; Household Arts Show) was an annual exhibition in Paris of domestic appliances, furniture and home designs. It was first held as the Salon des appareils ménagers (Home Appliances Fair) in 1923, with 100,000 visitors. By the 1950s each exhibition attracted up to 1.4 million visitors.

The SAM was run by government agencies and served an educational purpose, introducing consumers to new types of appliance and new materials. It also provided a showplace for new commercial products. The exhibition introduced modern concepts of home layout, with the kitchen moved from the back of the apartment to a central position near the entrance and near the dining and living room(s). Ergonomically designed kitchens and labor-saving devices minimized the effort required of housewives. The Salon became less relevant as department stores and specialty outlets began to offer broader ranges of products. The last exhibition was held in 1983.

== History ==
=== 1920s: Establishment ===
The Salon was created by Jules-Louis Breton, who had been Undersecretary of State for Inventions during World War I (1914–18) and then Minister of Health and Social Welfare. He was the first director of the National Board of Scientific and Industrial Research and Inventions (ORNI: Office national des recherches scientifiques et industrielles et des Inventions), created on 29 December 1922 and dissolved on 24 May 1938, predecessor of the Centre national de la recherche scientifique (CNRS). The show was financed and supervised by the ORNI, and then from 1938 by the CNRS, which received the profits. Breton's son Paul was commissaire of the Salon from 1929 to 1976, and Paul's brother André was director of the Arts Ménagers publication.

The first Salon des Appareils Ménagers (Home Appliances Fair) was held between 18 October 1923 and 4 November 1923 in 5,000 square metres (54,000 sq ft) of the Foire de Paris on the Champ de Mars. The first show was held in a simple hut. The show gave prizes and medals to the inventors of the best domestic appliances, judged by ORNI and the Ministry of Public Education. The show was a great success, with 100,000 visitors and 200 exhibitors. The second Salon des Appareils Ménagers was held on the Champ de Mars on 21 October 1924 – 9 November 1924. There was no Salon in 1925, but the government decided that year to make the show an annual event.

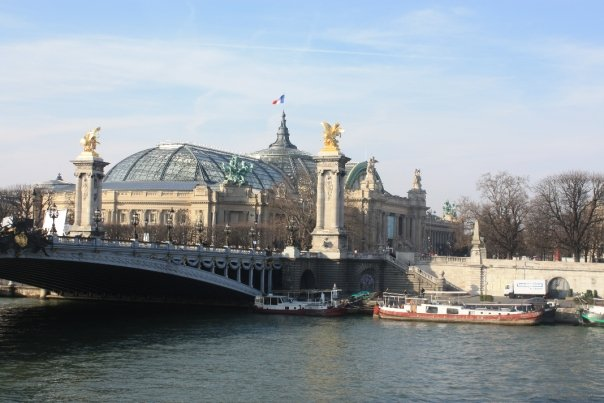
The Grand Palais housed the SAM from 1926 to 1961

In 1926 the SAM was held in the Grand Palais on the Champs-Élysées, now called the Salon des Arts Ménagers (SAM; Domestic Arts Show), again showing domestic appliances but now also showing products and materials needed for their installation and organization in the house. The SAM would remain at the Grand Palais until 1961. The 1926 show had 145,600 visitors and 328 exhibitors. The SAM began to be involved in experiments with new architecture. In 1927 an official monthly magazine was launched, L’Art Ménager. An annual reader's competition was organized to select the "most beautiful cover". Prizes were given at the show for a cooking competition and for the best housekeeper. There were more competitions in the Salons that followed, and more activities associated with the show including cooking lessons, concerts and conferences on furniture and decoration.

=== 1930s: Innovation ===
In 1930 Francis Bernard portrayed Marie Mécanique on posters for the Salon, a robot housemaid who became the symbol of the Salon. There were 269,000 visitors in 1932. In 1932 organization of the SAM was given to the Comité Français des Expositions (CFE). In 1933 the SAM hosted new events, such as the Fish Fortnight. Architects and decorators had formed the Union des Artistes Modernes (UAM) in 1929 to promote their views on decorative art, which sought purer harmony in place of ornamentation. The UAM published a manifesto in 1934 and asked to participate in the Salon. The resulting home design exhibit in the Salon was organized with the help of the magazine L’Architecture d’aujourd’hui (Today's Architecture). The first prize for a house for a family of two parents and three children was won by A. and E. Novello. A model was built on the ground floor. The 1936 Salon presented new housing materials and their applications, such as stainless steel and fiber cement.

The numbers of visitors to the SAM rose steadily, with 410,000 in 1935, 428,000 in 1936, 487,000 in 1937 and 535,000 in 1938. In 1939 there were 608,000 visitors, and the SAM covered 35,000 square metres (380,000 sq ft). The goals were defined as simplifying the work of housewives through invention of devices such as dishwashers, presenting new products and materials, and teaching women to use the devices. Gas and electricity companies demonstrated how their products could replace wood and then coal, providing comfort and efficiency while saving time, effort and money. The new products would transform the lives of housewives. Major brands at the show included Aspiron, Auer, Berger, Calor, De Dietrich, Electrolux, Frigidaire, Hoover, Jex, Johnson and Spontex.

=== 1940s: Recovery ===
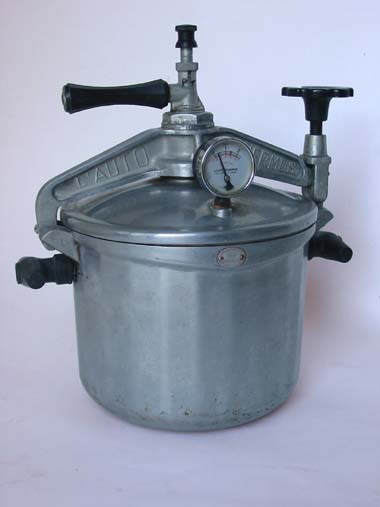
1940s pressure cooker by Autothermos

The SAM was suspended during World War II (1939–45). and did not resume until 1948. Reconstruction and redevelopment of old buildings were important post-war themes, as were the search for a hygienic and comfortable lifestyle and exploration of new materials such as metal or plastic. The wide availability of gas and electricity inspired new appliances including vacuum cleaners, pressure cookers, irons, washing machines, heaters, refrigerators and hairdryers. However, many of the visitors in the first decade after the war were living in old, cramped accommodations, often without running water, gas or electricity. (Note: The 1946 census found that 31% of urban dwellings had no water or electricity, increasing to 80% in rural communes.) They preferred to delay purchase of major appliances until they could move into a more modern house or apartment. They visited the Salon to learn what was available and to decide on what would be most important. A gas water heater above the sink could be a more practical aspiration than a washing machine.

The public status of the SAM helped it maintain its mission as one of social utility and education. Traditionally the Parisian apartment had a kitchen at the back overlooking a service yard, with food carried through a corridor to the room where the family ate. Experiment in the inter-war period led to new post-war designs in which the kitchen was moved near to the apartment's entrance, close to the living and dining room. The back stairs disappeared. Water, electricity, gas and sewage were now integrated into the design of buildings. The kitchen was relatively small, with a layout designed to let the housewife perform different tasks without moving. The SAM played an important role in introducing these innovations. In Marcel Gascoin's 8-piece "Logis 1949" display the kitchen played a central role and followed the ergonomic principles spelled out by Paulette Bernège (Note: Paulette Bernège founded the Institut d'Organisation Ménagère (Institute for Household Management) in 1923 and played a central role in setting up the Ligue d'Organisation Ménagère (League for Household Management).) in the inter-war period.

The first exhibition after the war, the 17th Salon, opened on 26 February 1948. The economy had not yet recovered and the goods on display could only be ordered with delays of two to six months. There were 795,113 visitors. When the 18th Salon opened on 25 February 1949 products were more readily available, but prices were too high for most of the visitors. The 1949 Salon had new sections such as "Woman and Child" and "Gastronomy", There were 951,139 visitors. A cinema news item filmed at the 1949 Salon showed the Minister of Education Yvon Delbos during his inaugural visit and gave close-ups of washing machines, dishwashers and a refrigerator. The narrative was addressed to the ladies (mesdames) who would benefit from the labor-saving devices.

=== 1950s: Growing prosperity ===
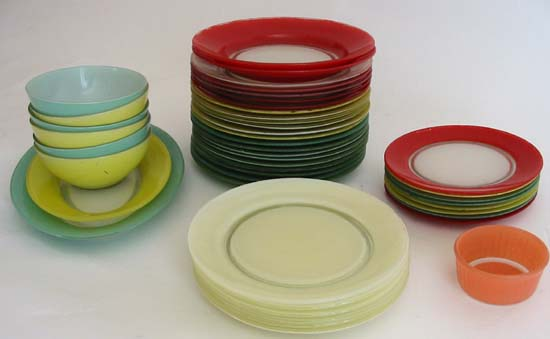
Duralex colored glass plates and bowls, around 1958

The 1950 exhibition had sections on Antique Arts in Modern Life, Today's Home, the Cité 50, Rural Domestic Arts, Kitchen Furnishings, Collective Living, Food, Wine, Furniture, The Room of the Woman and Child, Cleaning Products and Home Appliances. During the 1950 exhibition there were twenty-eight conferences, including "If Women Designed Home Appliances" by Paulette Bernège and "Joy and Comfort through Color and Light." The Formes utiles design group, created by the UAM in 1949, began to exhibit objects at the Salon that met the criteria of being everyday objects, handcrafted or made industrially, with good quality, pleasing forms and reasonable prices. The Salon had a restaurant that featured different regional specialties each night.

In 1950 the housing section reappeared, sponsored by the Ministry of Reconstruction and Urban Development. The Exposition on Habitation in the gardens included an exhibit on Le Corbusier's new apartment complex in Marseille. In February 1955 a home completely built from plastic drew more than 200,000 visitors. The design was conceived by Ionel Schein, Y. Magnant and R.A. Coulon and was financed by the Charbonnages de France and Houillères du Nord coal companies, who foresaw huge possibilities in making plastics from coal.

The number of visitors to the SAM in 1953 was down from the previous year, but sales were up, particularly refrigerators and washing machines. Visits then rose from 1.2 million in 1953 to 1.4 million in 1956. With more than 1,200 exhibitors, a visitor could get lost in the maze. By the mid-1950s consumers were more prosperous and more likely to buy, often taking advantage of newly available credit arrangements. (Note: In 1954 only 7.5% of French households owned a refrigerator. This would rise to 20.5% in 1959 and 72.5% by 1968. Similarly, only 8.4% of households owned a washing machine in 1954, rising to 21.4% in 1959 and 49.9% in 1968.) Although the SAM supported commerce, by arranging products by type rather than by brand it helped visitors compare features and prices. The Salon organizers tried to impose some degree of uniformity on the display stands, but there was naturally competition by the vendors to attract attention through taller and more original stands. To counteract this, all displays had to meet standards and be approved by a committee. There was some social segregation. The displays of inexpensive small items in the basement from 1956 tended to be fairly chaotic, with visitors able to pick up and examine the products, while the booths upstairs showing the larger and more expensive items were calmer and more elegant.

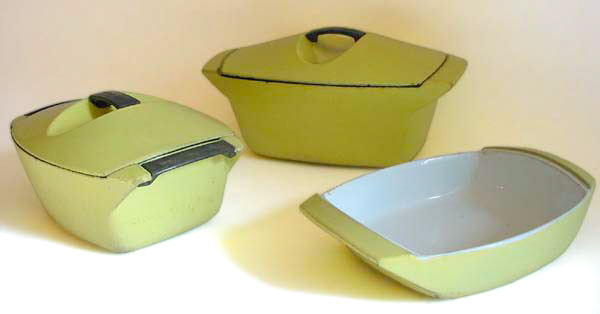
Coquelle Le Creuset, cooking pots designed by Raymond Loewy, around 1958

Consumer attitudes changed during the 1950s, and appliances such as refrigerators and washing machines came to be seen as necessities rather than luxuries. The SAM organizers played a role in the organization that set standards for appliances, defining essential, desirable and optional features, and tried to ensure that the products exhibited met these standards. Appliance designs in the early 1950s were often austere and functional, but from 1955 they became more colorful and diverse, so the housewife could demonstrate her good taste in selecting items that would make the kitchen more welcoming and that would showcase the family's prosperity. By the late 1950s there was a return to cleaner designs without decorative moldings, with line and angle replacing rounded forms and a return to white or neutral colors.

The volume of sales seems to have peaked in the 1955–57 period. After this the SAM became more a place where consumers or professionals came to gain information. Purchases would be made at department stores or specialty stores. The Salon continued to be the key annual marketing event for consumer appliance manufacturers, dictating the rhythm of new product introduction and advertising. The Prefect of the Saine noted in 1958 that the SAM generated far more business than was transacted at the event. Many consumers bought products from retailers that they had selected at the Salon. The retailer would provide delivery, installation and repair services.

=== Last years ===
The CNIT, which housed the Salon from 1961 to 1983

The 1960 Salon included exhibits of complete areas such as the kitchen, bathroom and living room. In 1961 the SAM moved into larger and more modern premises in the Centre des nouvelles industries et technologies (CNIT) in La Défense. It remained at the CNIT from 1961 until it was dissolved in 1983. In March 1965 Le Figaro noted that dishwashers seemed to have finally become accepted after fifteen years of false starts, with about thirty brands shown at the SAM. They were still expensive items, but according to the newspaper they were much more hygienic than hand washing, more economical of water and soap and produced brighter results.

The Salon des Arts Ménagers celebrated its 50th anniversary in 1973. From 1976 it was run by the Secretary of State for Universities. It was dissolved and its staff dismissed on 31 December 1983. It was replaced by the PROMODO domestic appliance show, organized by and for professionals at the Parc des Expositions de Villepinte.

== Publications ==
The Salon des Arts Ménagers published several titles including:

- Paulette Bernège (1950). Le blanchissage domestique (in French).
- Maurice Loyer (1954). L'art d'autrefois dans la demeure d'aujourd'hui (in French).
- Marie-Louise Cordillot (1954). Les cours ménagers (in French).
- Jacqueline Pecquet, avocate à la cour (1956). Notre maison et ses problèmes (in French).

== Sources ==
- Gracieux, Christophe (2015). "Les nouveautés présentées au Salon des Arts ménagers 1949". Jalons. INA.
- "La nouvelle offensive de charme des "laveuses à vaisselle"". Le Figaro (in French). 10 March 1965.
- "Le Salon des Arts Ménagers" (PDF). CNRS. May 2000.
- Leymonerie, Claire (2006). "Le Salon des arts ménagers dans les années 1950". Vingtième Siècle. Revue d'histoire (in French). 3 (91). Presses de Sciences Po (P.F.N.S.P.).
- "Maison tout en plastiques, Salon des Arts ménagers, Paris, 1956". FRAC Centre.
- Pulju, Rebecca (2011-02-14). "The Salon des arts ménagers: Learning to Consume in Postwar France". Women and Mass Consumer Society in Postwar France. Cambridge University Press. ISBN 978-1-107-00135-0.
- "Salons des Appareils Ménagers". Les Arts Décoratifs (in French).
- "Salon des Arts Ménagers". A Dictionary of Modern Design. Oxford University Press.
