= Abd-el-Tif prize =

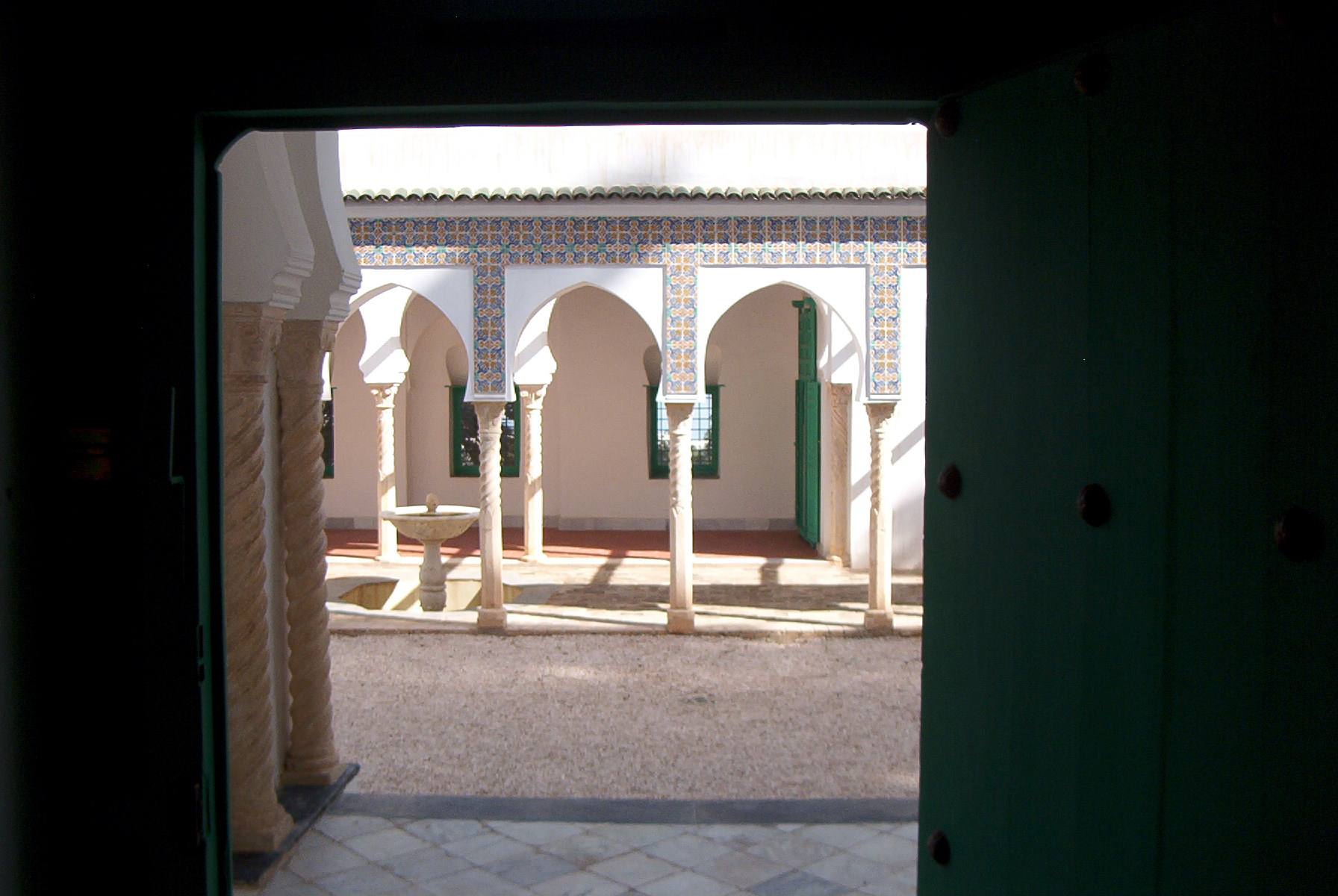
Colonnades of the villa Abd-el-Tif

The Prix Abd-el-Tif (Abd-el-Tif prize) was a French art prize that was awarded annually from 1907 to 1961. It was modelled on the Prix de Rome, a scholarship that enabled French artists to stay in Rome.

The award was devised in 1907 by Léonce Bénédite, curator of the Museum of Luxembourg and Charles Jonnart, governor-general of French Algeria. The prize comprised a bursary and a year's free stay at the Villa Abd-el-Tif in Algiers, a state-owned institution for the study of Islamic art. Each year's prize winners were chosen by the Society of French Orientalist Painters.

== Prize winners ==
- 1907 : Léon Cauvy (1874–1933), painter, and Paul Jouve (1880–1973), animal painter and sculptor
- 1908 : Jacques Simon (1875–1965), painter. Pierre Poisson (1876–1953), sculptor
- 1909 : Léon Carré (1878–1942), painter, and Jules Migonney (1876–1929)
- 1910 : Charles Dufresne (1875–1938), painter, and Henri Villain (1878–1938), painter
- 1911 : Adolphe Beaufrere (1876–1960), painter and engraver
- 1912 : Charles Bigonet (1877–1931), sculptor and Gustave Hierholtz (1877–1948), sculptor
- 1913 : Marius de Buzon (1879–1958), painter, André Chapuy (1882–1941), painter and engraver
- 1914 : Charles-René Darrieux, painter, Albert Pommier (1880–1944), sculptor
- 1920 : Paul Élie Dubois (1886–1949), painter, and Jean Launois (1898–1942), painter
- 1921 : Maurice Bouviolle (1893–1971), painter and 1921 : Jean Bouchaud (1891–1977), painter
- 1922 : Pierre Deval (1897–1993), painter, and Ludovic Pineau (1886–1935), sculptor
- 1923 : Jacques Denier (1894–1983), painter, and Jean Désiré Bascoules (1886–1976), painter
- 1924 : Étienne Bouchaud (1898–1989), painter, and André Rigal (1888–1953), painter and sculptor
- 1925 : Louis Berthomme Saint André (1905–1977), painter, and Eugène Corneau (1894–1975), painter and engraver
- 1926 : Louis Riou (1893–1958), painter
- 1927 : Louis Dideron (1901–1980), sculptor, and André Thomas Rouault (1899–1949), painter and decorator
- 1928 : René Levrel (1900–1981), painter, and Luc Rousseau (1899–1958), painter
- 1929 : Pierre-Eugène Clairin (1897–1980), painter, and Georges Halbout du Tanney (1895–1986), sculptor
- 1930 : Henri Clamens (1905–1937), painter, and André Hébuterne (1894–1979), painter
- 1931 : Pierre Farrey (1896–1987), painter, and Jacques Wolf (1896–1956), painter
- 1932 : Marcel Damboise (1932–1992), sculptor and Richard Maguet (1896–1940), painter
- 1933 : André Hambourg (1909–1999), painter, and Émile Bouneau (1902–1970), painter
- 1934 : Francois Caujan (1902–1945), sculptor, Roger Nivelt (1899–1962), painter
- 1935 : Emile Sabouraud (1900–1996), painter, and Jean Hustel (1906–1991), painter
- 1936 : René Gilles (1910–?), painter, and Jean Meunier (1903–?), architect
- 1937 : Camille Leroy (1905–1995), painter, and Antoine Ferrari (1910–1995),
- 1938 : Jean Beaunier (1908–1947), painter, and Edgard Pillet (1912–1997), painter and sculptor
- 1939 : Pierre Lepage (1906–1983), painter, and Jean-André Cante (1912–1977), painter
- 1942 : André Bourdil, (1911–1982), painter, and Jean-Eugene Bersier (1895–1980), painter and engraver
- 1945 : Georges Le Poitevin (1912–1992), painter, and Francois Fauck (1911–1979), painter
- 1946 : Maurice Boitel (1919–2007), painter, and André Beauce (1911–1974), painter
- 1947 : Jean Marie Chabot (1914–2015), painter, and Paul Ragueneau (1913–1986), painter
- 1948 : Jean Pierre Cornet (? ), painter and engraver, and Pierre Quiniou (1920–2015), painter and engraver
- 1949 : Jacques Houplain (1920–2020), engraver, and Jean Carton (1912–1988), sculptor
- 1950 : Pierre Brandel, painter,(1912–2003), and Gabriel Bougrain
- 1951 : Pierre Pruvost (1921–2008), painter, and Jean Menoucoutin, sculptor died at the Villa Abd-el-Tif in 1953
- 1952 : Pierre Parsus (1921–), painter, and Jean Vimenet (1914–1999)
- 1953 : Robert Martin (1925–2001), painter
- 1954 : Jack Chambrin (1919–1983), painter, and François Cacheux (1923–2011), sculptor
- 1955 : Jean Gachet, painter (1920–2003)
- 1956 : Jean-Pierre Blanche (1927–), painter, Gisèle.Georges-Mianes dite G.Georges - Mianes first woman laureate (1928–), painter, Jean-Marie Albagnac (1931–), engraver and photographer
- 1957 : Hubert le Mab (1924–), painter
- 1958 : Marc Gruais (1932–), painter, and Gérard Roland (1932–), painter
- 1959 : Jean Bellenger, (1925–2017), painter
- 1960 : Pierre Clément (1923–2011), painter, Pierre Telliez (1932–), and Gauthier known as Gartier Pierre (1930–2016), painter
- 1961 : Victor Candale - did not stay in Algeria
- 1961 : Françoise Naudet, sculptor - did not stay in Algeria

== See also ==
- List of European art awards
