= Pierre Parsus =

French painter and illustrator (1921–2022)

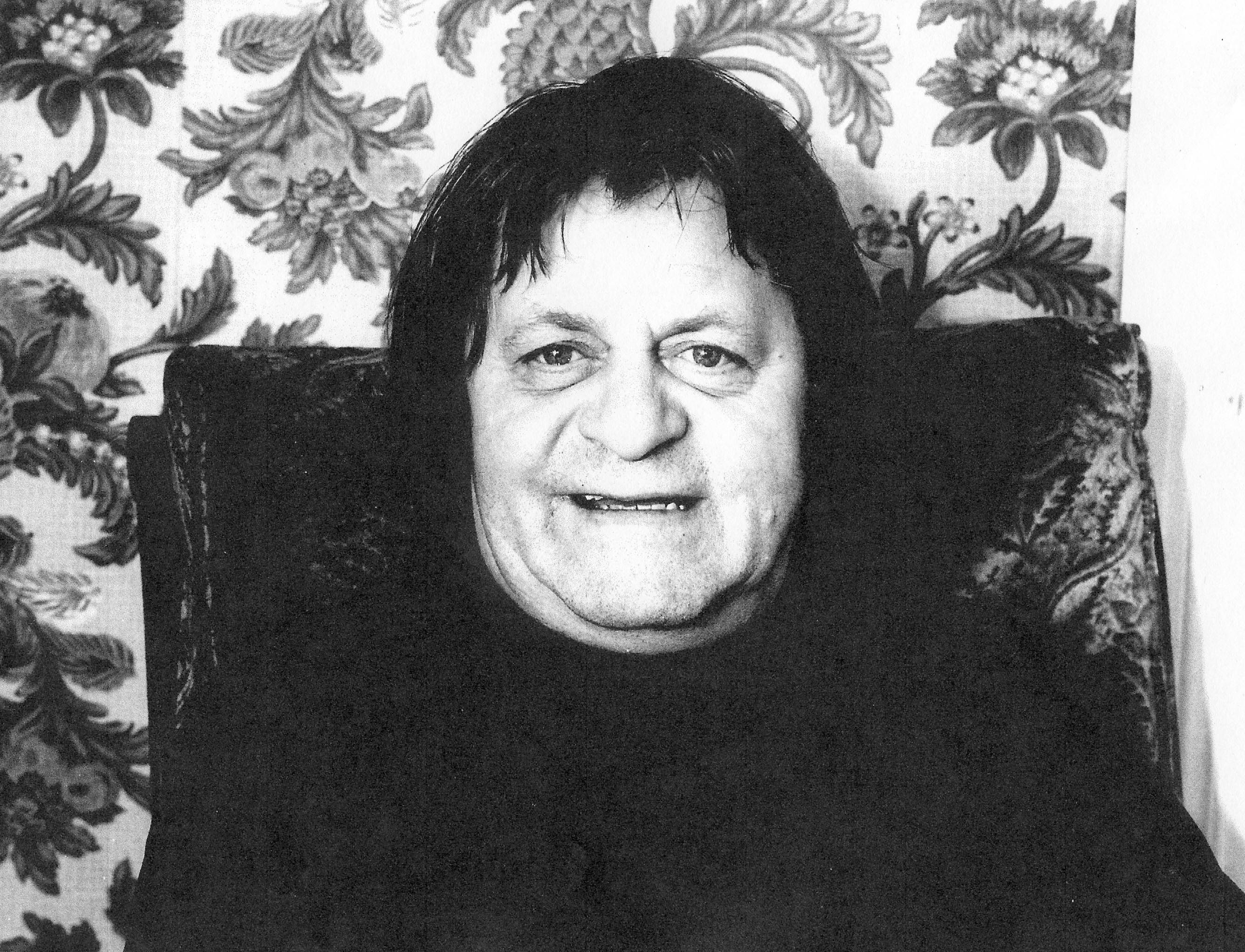
- Parsus in 2015
- Born: 6 June 1921; Paris, France
- Died: 1 January 2022 (aged 100); Castillon-du-Gard, France
- Occupations: Painter; Illustrator

Pierre Parsus (6 June 1921 – 1 January 2022) was a French painter and illustrator.

== Biography ==
Parsus studied at the École nationale supérieure des arts appliqués et des métiers d'art and learned under the sculptors Charles Malfray, Jacques Zwobada, and René Babin. He discovered Paul Cézanne at a retrospective at the Musée de l'Orangerie in 1935 and Vincent van Gogh at the Exposition Internationale des Arts et Techniques dans la Vie Moderne in 1937.

During the onset of World War II, Parsus trained as a boilermaker, working in Bayac and joining the Compagnons de France. He was mobilized for nine months in Arudy and worked in the Chantiers de la jeunesse. Following his release from the workcamp, he created the Théâtre du berger with Yves Joly, Guy Bourguignon, and Georges Croses in 1942. In March 1943, he was forced into the Service du travail obligatoire at a fabric factory in Vienna. In June of that year, he fled Vienna and returned to Paris, where he found his family and resumed painting.

After World War II, Parsus joined the Jeune Peinture movement and began exhibiting in Paris and Nîmes. In 1952, he was awarded the Villa Abd-el-Tif Prize, which subsequently sent him to live in the Algiers palace for two years. Upon his return to Paris, he received the Prix Fénéon for Art in 1957. That year, he became a member of the Salon d'Automne. In 1969, he and François Rouan created a 1700 square meter sundial on the floor of Montpellier 2 University.

In November 2000, at the inauguration of the Salle Henri d'Estienne at the Musée de Narbonne, Parsus donated three of his works he created during his stay in Algiers: Femmes Kabyles de retour du marché, Paysage de Kabylie, and À Biskra. In 2003, the city of Nîmes commissioned a large painting from him for the bullfighting museum. From 24 March to 15 October 2017, a retrospective titled "Du figuratif au sacré, du visuel à la vision" was held in his honor at the Salle d'exposition Jean-Luc Fiches du Pont-du-Gard. At the end of 2017, he painted works based on the retrospective, such as Giono et les peintres and Apollinaire et Parsus, deux artistes de Nîmes.

Parsus died in Castillon-du-Gard on 1 January 2022, at the age of 100.

== Awards ==
- Villa Abd-el-Tif Prize (1952)
- Prix Fénéon (1957)
- Prix René Cottet (1957)
- Gold Medal of the Festival international d'Art plastique du Hainaut (1979)

== Publications ==
- Carnets d'atelier N°6 (1998)
- L'Art singulier (2005)
- Pictor (2009)
- Rétrospective Pierre Parsus 2017 au Pont-du-Gard (2017)
- Que voyez-vous Monsieur ?
