= Eugénie O'Kin =

French-Japanese artist

- Born: Eugénie Jubin; May 13, 1880; Yokohama, Japan
- Died: 1948 (aged 67–68); Nice, France
- Occupation: Artist
- Spouse: Henri Simmen

Eugénie Jubin, known professionally as Eugénie O’Kin, was a French and Japanese artist born in Yokohama on May 13, 1880, and deceased in Nice in 1948. Known for her work with ivory and ceramics, O’Kin introduced traditional Japanese techniques into the field of modernist sculpture, for which she was celebrated by a public enamored with her as a figure of refined exoticism.

== Biography ==
=== Early life ===
Eugénie O’Kin was born to a Japanese mother, Yamanaka Tama, and a French father, Charles Marie Jubin, a businessman who emigrated to Japan around 1870 in order to establish a silk trade outpost, while his brother Emile managed their business from Paris and gained prominence as an oriental art collector. Growing up in this environment of cross-cultural exchange through her family's involvement in trading artisanal goods as well as during an unprecedented period of Japan's openness, young Eugénie reciprocated her uncle's fascination with art, a love which her parents encouraged. She initially found inspiration and developed her personal style through copying patterns she found in textiles, ceramics, or prints and then distorted them to create her own stylized drawings rendered in fluid, expressive line. Through the artistic and financial support of her family, she was able to attend Dames de St. Maur de Yokohama, the only French school in the city, where she could further her craft as a ceramicist and solidify her bilingual abilities.

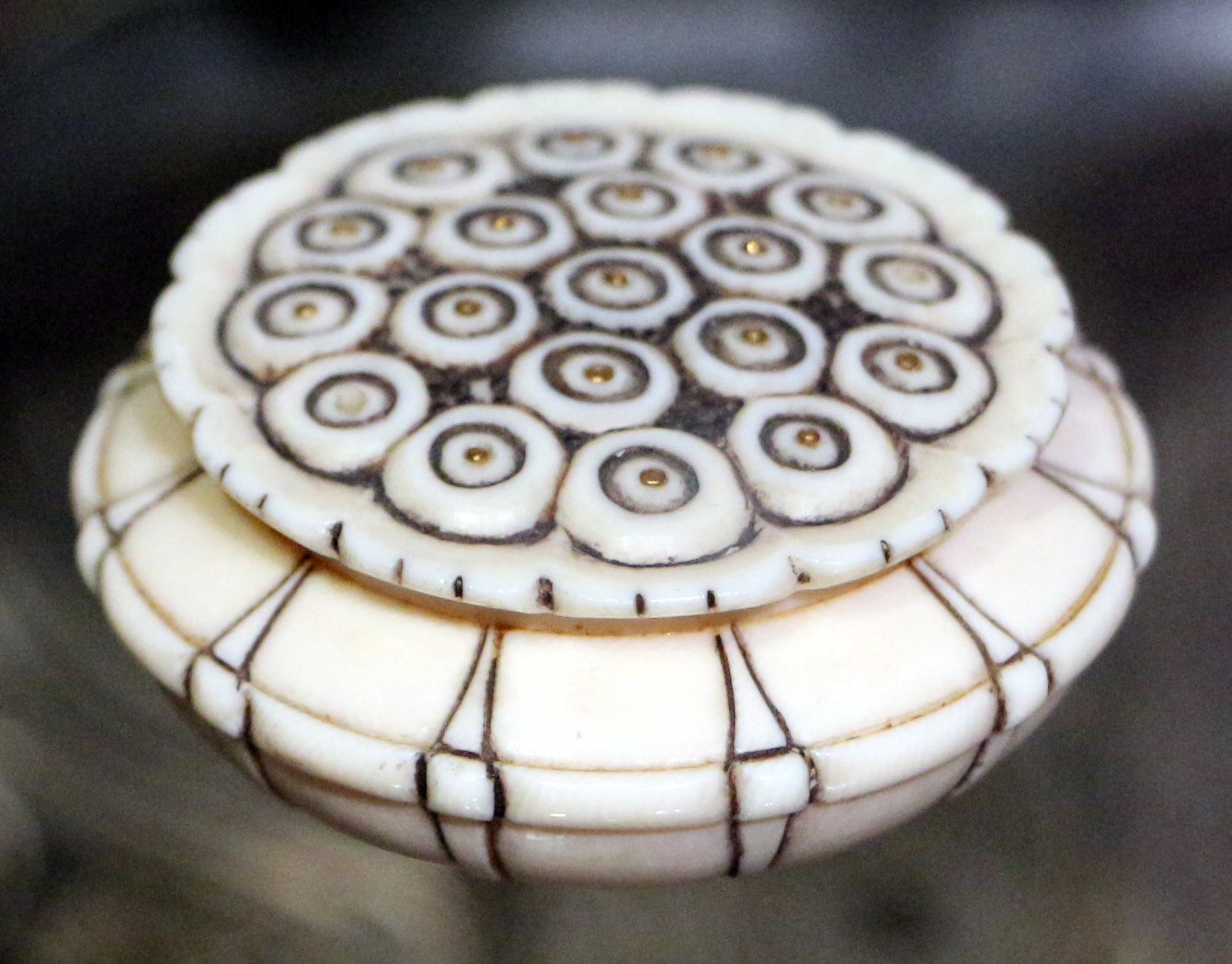
Eugénie O'Kin, Bonbonnière, c. 1912, carved, engraved, and painted ivory; gold studs. 2.6 cm x 5.5 cm. Paris, Musée D’Orsay.

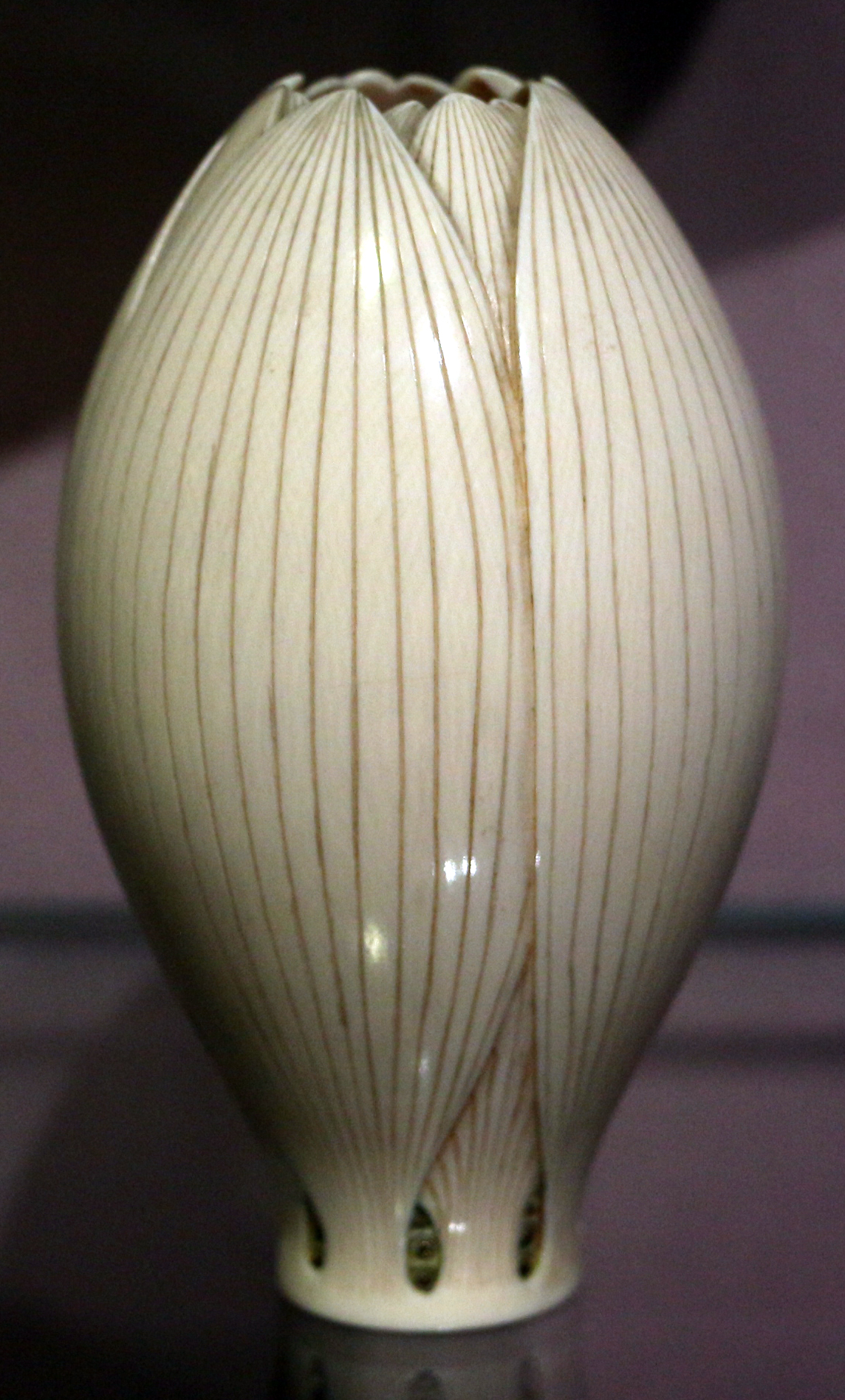
Eugénie O'Kin, Bouton de lotus, c. 1914, carved, engraved, and painted ivory; gold studs. 12.6 cm x 7.6 cm. Paris, Musée D'Orsay.

=== Discovery in Paris ===
Shortly after the death of her father and the completion of her education, Eugénie O’Kin made the decision to travel to Paris around the year 1900 to study her craft under the tutelage of designer and sculptor Henri Hamm, which would prove to be the catalyst for her emergence into the greater art scene. While working with Hamm, O’Kin was introduced to another young artist on the rise, sculptor Henri Simmen, whom she would later marry. It is probable that as the two studied together, O’Kin taught Simmen traditional Japanese and other Asian ceramic techniques which would prove to set his work apart from his French contemporaries. After studying for six years, she exhibited her work for the first time in 1906 at the Salon L’Automne , and then again at the Salons of the French National Society of Fine Arts. At the 1910 Salon, the Musee des Arts Decoratifs of Paris purchased one of her pieces, a cup made of an engraved animal horn and decorated with pearl and silver, to be a part of their permanent collection. Met with great success, O’Kin would continue to participate in the salon scene of Paris until the start of the First World War.

=== Travels in Asia ===
With her new husband, Eugénie traveled throughout Asia from 1919 to 1921. While the initial intention of the trip was to visit Eugénie's brother, Henri-Emille Jubin, in Angkor, the couple extended their journey after becoming fascinated with native Cambodian or Khmer art. They continued their travels in China, Korea, and finally Japan where Henri would continue his study of traditional pottery techniques just as Eugénie had once been taught. These visits left a lasting mark on both artists, whose creations, both solo and collaborative, would reveal deep influences from other Asian traditions, particularly that of the Khmer tradition.

=== Return to France ===
After returning to France with revitalized inspiration, the couple moved to the Montredon district of Marseille, the port of arrival for rubber and other imports from Asia, in 1923. It is here that Henri and Eugénie founded their new workshop under the resolve to solely use traditional artisanal methods in the creation of their work, a direct departure from the practices of their contemporaries who now wished to dissociate the aesthetic design from the manual realization of the object. With these intentions of preserving traditional ways of making art, the two were great collaborators, Eugénie making ivory lids and stoppers to adorn Henri's ceramic pieces, in addition to her own work. She would also act as a supplier of ivory and other precious materials to many renowned designers of her time, such as Emile-Jacques Ruhlmann. The two would also enter into a collaboration, O’Kin providing materials for his exhibitions in return for an opportunity to have her work presented in his Collector's Hotel during the International Exhibition of Decorative Arts.

=== Legacy ===
Though a virtuoso in her field, O'Kin's legacy, specifically that of her autonomous works, has been overshadowed by the career of her husband within art historical narratives. While much of Henri Simmen's success is owed to the techniques, sensibilities, and cultures to which he was exposed due to his relationship with O'Kin, her influence on his work is primarily only recognized in consideration of the stoppers and lids she created for his ceramic pieces. Rather than an accessory to the work of another artist, the work of Eugénie O'Kin truly served as the catalyst for the stylistic development of not only her husband, but also their modernist contemporaries who sought innovation by way of adopting and often appropriating techniques of other cultures to which they had not been previously exposed. With meticulous elegance and immense respect for the materials she worked with, O'Kin created a body of work which invites contemplation, reflection, and even criticism of the artistic exchanges between East and West during the emergence of Modernism.
