= Pascual and Vincent =

Spanish photographic duo

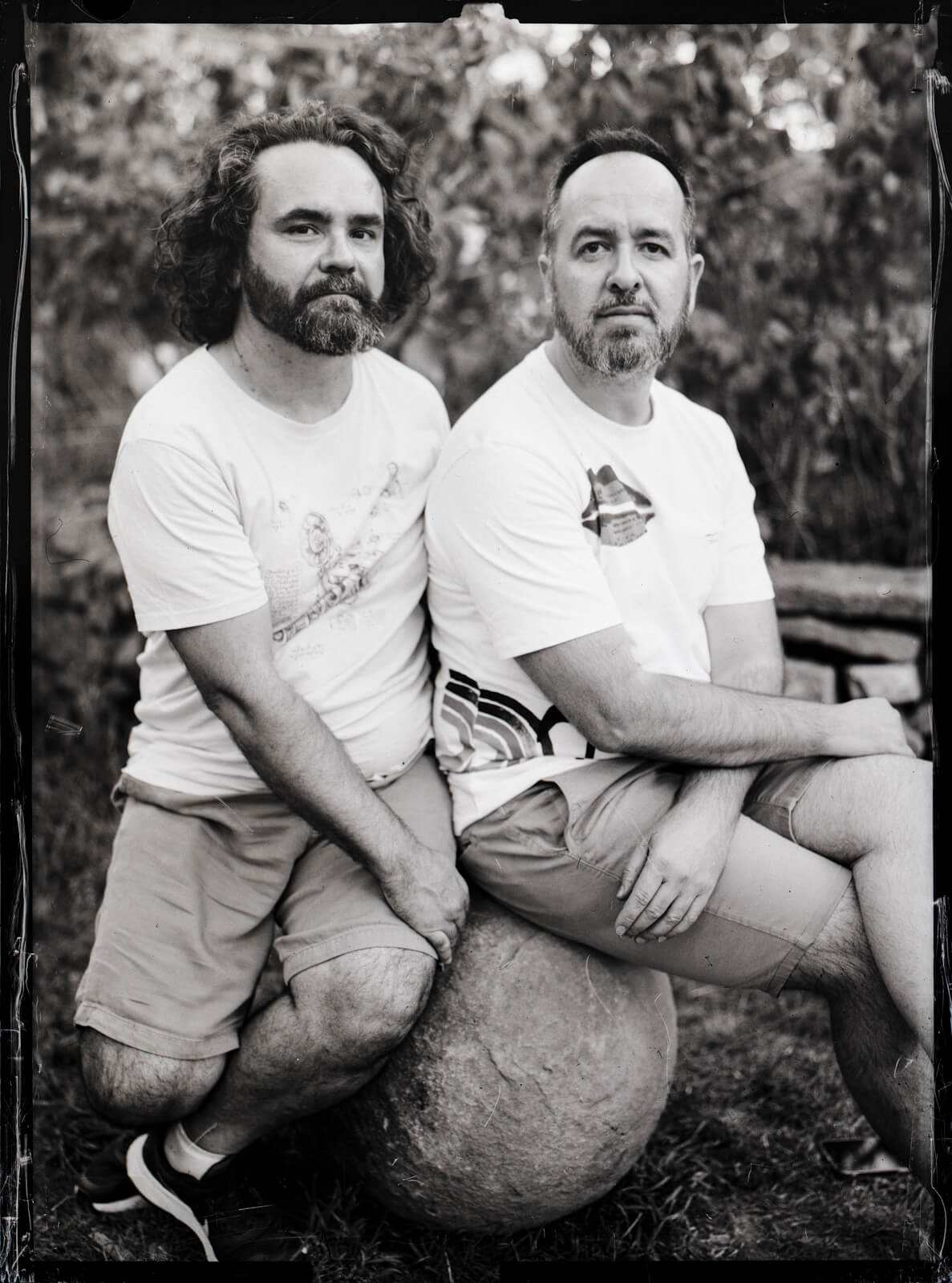
Pascual and Vincent in 2024

Pascual Martínez (born 1977 in Murcia) and Vincent Sáez (born 1976 in Alicante) are Spanish photographers who work together as Pascual + Vincent. They have published two photobooks about Romania with the London publisher Overlapse.

== Background ==
Martínez and Sáez both trained at the Escuela de Arte de Murcia. They started working together in 2014, during a residency at The Can Openhouse in Bucharest. Both also teach photography and have curated exhibitions in Spain.

== Work ==
=== The Tree of Life is Eternally Green (2018) ===
Their first book, The Tree of Life is Eternally Green, was issued by Overlapse in March 2018 (ISBN 9780994791948). The photographs, taken during travels through rural Romania, are interleaved with pressed flowers and leaves collected on the way, drawings and semi-translucent paper inserts. Reviews appeared in Float Magazine and Aint-Bad.

In 2018 the book won the ArtsLibris–Fundació Banc Sabadell Prize at the ArtsLibris fair in Barcelona, and was selected for the photobook exhibition at the Athens Photo Festival, held at the Benaki Museum. Earlier stages of the project had been shown at the 2017 PHotoESPAÑA Forum (Sala El Águila, Madrid) and at the PA-TA-TA Festival in Granada the same year.

=== The Saxons of Transylvania (2019) ===
The Saxons of Transylvania was published in November 2019 (ISBN 9781999446833), with support from the Romanian Cultural Institute. The book is about the Transylvanian Saxons, an ethnic German community in central Romania whose population fell sharply after 1990, when most of them emigrated to Germany and other countries. The book combines new photographs with archival material, drawings and short texts.

Babelia, the literary supplement of El País, reviewed the book in November 2019, and ABC Cultural published an interview with the duo the previous month. The book was presented at Ivorypress in Madrid and at the Polycopies fair in Paris in 2019. The Chinese editor He Yining included it in a selection of eight photography books of 2019 for Paper Magazine (China), and it was a finalist for the 2020 Aperture Portfolio Prize.

== Awards and grants ==
The duo received Foreign Cultural Journalists grants from the Romanian Cultural Institute in 2015, 2017, 2018, 2019 and 2024. Vincent held a residency grant at the Casa de Velázquez in 2016. Other awards include the Hacer. PHotoESPAÑA Forum – Comunidad de Madrid prize in 2017 (Sala El Águila), the 2018 ArtsLibris–Fundació Banc Sabadell Prize, and the XVII University of Murcia Photography Prize in 2018. They were finalists for the Aperture Portfolio Prize in 2020 and selected for the ENAIRE Foundation Photography Prize in 2025.

== Bibliography ==
- The Tree of Life is Eternally Green. London: Overlapse, 2018. ISBN 9780994791948.
- The Saxons of Transylvania. London: Overlapse, 2019. ISBN 9781999446833.
