= Fabien Vienne =

French architect (1925–2016)

- Born: 18 February 1925; Paris, France
- Died: 31 March 2016 (aged 91)
- Citizenship: France
- Education: École des Arts-Appliqués
- Occupation: Architect

Fabien Vienne (18 February 1925 - 31 March 2016) was a French architect, urban planner, and designer. Born in Paris, Vienne initially pursued a technical education and graduated from the École des Arts-Appliqués. Throughout his career, he has contributed to furniture design, urban planning, construction systems, original architectural projects and scenography design.

== Early life and influences ==
Vienne was born in Paris in 1925. In the 1940s Vienne discovered the Modern Movement and its French precursors. He joined Le Corbusier's former collaborator Jean Bossu in the task of rebuilding the war-ravaged country.

== Career development ==
In the early 1950s, Vienne was moved to Réunion, a French overseas territory in the Indian Ocean. There he inspected Bossu's construction sites and established a local office. This experience abroad left an impression on Vienne, and upon his return to France he founded his own firm, SOAA (Société d'Organization d'Architectes Associés).The company is still operating.

== Vienne's approach ==
Unlike many architects who focused on subsidized housing during a period of rapid economic growth, Vienne received commissions primarily from private developers, mostly construction contractors. This allowed him to explore alternative paths and demonstrate a sense of adaptability and invention.

One of Vienne's achievements is the development of the EXN construction system. This versatile and cost-effective system was used to build hundreds of wooden houses in La Réunion and continues to be used today. Vienne's capabilities were revealed through previous research and construction projects, such as the Trigone system (1968) used in resorts such as Vald'Yerre (1971).

Vienne's capacity to adapt is seen in the various project he has undertaken. These include houses, schools, office buildings, factories, universities, apartment complexes, hotels and health centers. Vienne's architectural solutions are known for their suitability and purposeful approach.

== Philosophy and legacy ==
Geometry and the principle of economy are two fundamental concepts that underpin Vienne's work. For him, geometry is not just a compositional tool but an epistemology — a way to understand and express the underlying laws of the world. The principle of economy goes beyond mere accounting in the art of building; it is about finding the essence of a problem and substantiating it in a solution that brings that essence to light and life.

== See also ==
- Zome
- Le Corbusier's Five Points of Architecture
