= Richard Maguet =

French painter

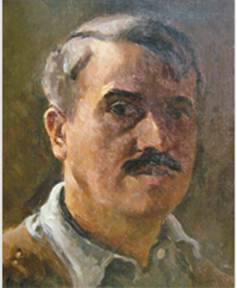
Self-portrait (late 1930s)

Richard Maguet (7 March 1896, Amiens – 16 June 1940, Sully-sur-Loire) was a French Post-Impressionist painter.

== Biography ==
He was born to a middle-class family of modest means. His first trip to Paris came in 1913. There, with a recommendation from the sculptor Albert Roze, he studied in the workshops of the designer, Berthold Mahn, who became one of his best friends. Two years later, he was conscripted and fought at the Battle of Verdun, for which he was awarded the Croix de Guerre. He was demobilized in 1919, returned to Paris, worked as a printer and, a year later, got married.

After that, he provided illustrations and cartoons for several newspapers, as well as doing costume designs. He also had his first solo exhibitions at the Salon d'Automne and the Salon des Indépendants. In the late 1920s, he made several stays in Yonne (notably at Cravant) and Boulogne-sur-Mer, with his friends Eugène Corneau and Jean Launois.

In 1930, he was named Secretary of the Salon d'Automne. Two years later, he toured Southern France and visited Algiers, where he stayed at the Villa Abd-el-Tif; one of the benefits of having been awarded the Prix Abd-el-Tif, together with the sculptor Marcel Damboise.

Shortly after returning, his wife, Lucienne, died of a heart attack. To help assuage his grief, he spent a year travelling throughout Algeria and Morocco. In 1935, he went back to Paris and married Denise Titre, a great-granddaughter of Elisée Reclus. She published a monograph of him as a wedding gift.

Camus had first encountered Maguet's work in Algiers around 1933, introduced to the painter through the philosopher Jean Grenier. In 1942, Camus wrote about Maguet in the student journal Alger étudiant. In 1949, he contributed an original essay to the catalogue of a retrospective exhibition at the Galerie André Maurice in Paris, a limited edition of 300 copies printed on vélin du Marais. In that text, Camus wrote of Maguet's late biblical series: noting that in his painting of the resurrection of Lazarus, the miracle did not appear as a supernatural event but as a natural continuation of life itself. Camus concluded: "Life begins again every day." The Abd-el-Tif prize, which Maguet received in 1932, was an annual French government grant enabling painters and sculptors to spend two years at the Villa Abd-el-Tif in Algiers as part of the broader programme of colonial artistic patronage that produced the so-called School of Algiers.

In 1939, he enlisted in the Army and was assigned to a Spahi regiment. The following year, he was killed in a bombing raid at Sully-sur-Loire. He was buried at a memorial cemetery in Saint-Père-sur-Loire. His tombstone was designed by his friend, Damboise.

== Selected paintings ==
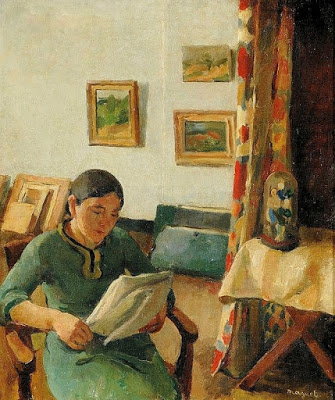
Interior (with Denise)

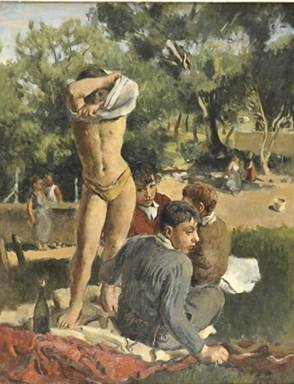
Young Men in the Park

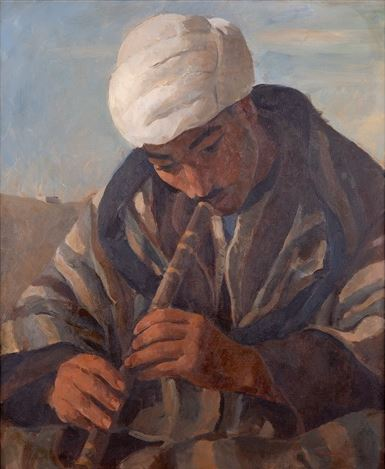
Moroccan Flutist

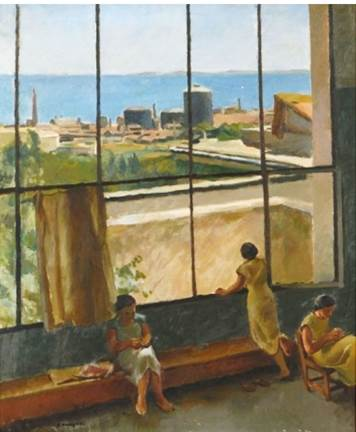
View from the Artist's Window at Abd-el-Tif

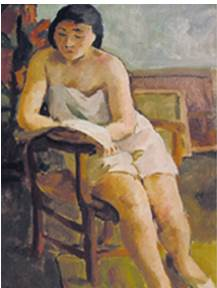
Seated Woman in Chemise, Reading
