= Albert Pommier =

French sculptor

- Born: 11 January 1880; Paris, France
- Died: 1943 (aged 62–63); Paris, France
- Occupation: Sculptor

Albert Pommier (11 January 1880, Paris – 1943, Paris) was a French sculptor.

== Biography ==
Born in Paris in 1880, Pommier studied at the École des Beaux Arts in Paris and was a pupil of Barrias. From 1905 he was a regular exhibitor at the Salon des Artistes Français and in 1914 won a prize and received a grant which allowed him to travel to Algeria and study there at the Villa Abd-el-Tif, although the outbreak of the war and his mobilization meant that he could only take advantage of this fully in 1919. During the war he served as a stretcher bearer in the 3rd battalion of the 11th Infantry Regiment. The villa Abd-el-Tif in Algeria was a villa established on similar lines to the Villa Médicis in Rome, and later the Casa de Velázquez in Madrid, to provide a location for French artists to study art – particularly Islamic art. Pommier had won the Abd-el-Tif prize, modelled on the "Prix de Rome", a joint prize and bursary and winning this prize enabled young talented artists to remain one or two years in Algiers with expenses paid. Pommier won the grand Prix at the 1937 Exposition Internationale.

== War memorials ==
=== The Hammam-Bou-Hadjar War Memorial ===
The Carrara marble statue of a soldier for this Algerian memorial was one of Pommier's best known works. Hammam-Bou-Hadjar lies some 70 kilometers south of Oran and is spa resort. Pommier was commissioned to execute the sculptural work for the memorial in 1931 and apart from the standing soldier he also created some splendid bas-reliefs for the 8-metre-high memorial's base. One bas-relief depicted a winged angel of victory holding branches of laurel. In another, two soldiers carry a dying comrade and in another two the day-to-day life of soldiers at the front is depicted. After Algerian independence the dismantlement of the memorial began and the marble plaques recording the names of the men honoured were destroyed. Successful steps were then taken to save the rest of the monument, largely led by a Mr.Montamat, who, at his own expense had the statue shipped to Toulon, via Mers-el-Kébir and it was then accepted by the mayor of Fréjus and erected there near the military base ("Base aéronavale"). Inauguration took place on 19 April 1964. Montamat subsequently saved the war memorials of Tlemcen and Mascara. He subsequently retired to Saint-Raphaël, and played an important role in having the Mémorial National à la gloire de l'Armée d'Afrique erected in Saint-Raphaël in 1975 ".

=== The Oran War Memorial ===
The original memorial in Oran was inaugurated on the 26 May 1927 and was erected in honour of the 12,000 men of Oran who gave their lives in the 1914-1918 war. The monument was called the "Monument de la Victoire". The architects were Dordet and Prinet and Pommier was responsible for the sculptural content involved. Carved from Magenta stone the edicice was 12 metres high with three French soldiers at the top. The inscription read

"Le département d'Oran à ses enfants morts pour la Patrie - 1914 – 1918"

At the monument's base the names of famous battles were listed

"Charleroi, Marne, Aisne, Flandre, Artois, Lorraine, Somme, Champagne, Verdun, Argonne, Dardanelles, Orient"

and on the side the inscription "Souvenez-vous" reminded the passer-by to "Remember". The memorial also listed a breakdown of the deaths being marked. 3,208 men from Oran, 1,217 men from Sidi-Bel-Abbès, 3,439 from Mostaganem, 1,136 from Tlemcen, 2,257 from Mascara and 1,252 from South Oran. After Algeria gained her independence the decision was made to move as much of the monument as was practical and La Duchère, Lyon was chosen as a suitable site. Negotiations started in earnest in 1967 and Pommier's sculpture was shipped to Marseille on 11 December of that year. A new pedestal was built and with Pommier's three soldiers suitable installed the inauguration took place on 13 July 1968. Various plaques and inscriptions were added to the monument including

""En souvenir de leur terre natale, la ville de Lyon à ses enfants d'Afrique du Nord qu'elle a accueillis"

(Note: Repatriation of monuments. Many of the First World War monuments in North Africa were "repatriated" to France after 1962, to be re-erected in various communes. What were reminders of France's colonialism were no longer welcome and at great expense to the French Navy, various stelae, sculptures, plaques and other memorabilia, referred to as "‘monuments en exil", were moved across the Mediterranean and offered to towns that wished to give a home to them. Some of the repatriated monuments were taken in by the French army and put in the H/Q or barracks of regiments the monuments were dedicated to. The 1931 monuments aux morts from the Foreign Legion's headquarters in Sidi Bel Abbès, a giant globe marking the battle of Camerone, surrounded by statues of Légionnaires from various epochs, was re-erected at the Légion’s base in Aubagne and the monument from the École Militaire in Cherchell was placed in the École d’Infanterie in Montpellier. Paul Landowski’s massive monument to wartime Franco-Moroccan fraternity, a French poilu and a Moroccan spahi mounted on horseback and shaking hands, unveiled by Marshal Lyautey in Casablanca in 1924, was scheduled to be demolished after Moroccan independence but was moved to Senlis, the town that had garrisoned the spahis. Other monuments ended up at institutions that had similar functions to those where they stood in Algeria: the one from the Institut Agricole of Maison-Carrée was placed in the École Nationale Supérieure d’Agronomie in Grignon in Yvelines. Sister-cities took monuments from the places with which they were paired in French Algeria. A set of plaques from Bougie bearing the names of three hundred fallen soldiers was delivered to Bougie’s sister-city, Bordeaux, and ceremoniously unveiled in 1968 by Jacques Chaban-Delmas, mayor of Bordeaux, and Jacques Augarde, the last French mayor of Bougie. Communes that felt a link with the old French outposts, sometimes because of the presence of "pieds-noirs", especially in the Midi, requested and received monuments for their municipalities. For instance, Joseph Ebstein’s marble victory and two soldiers from Tlemcen ended up in Saint-Aygulf in (Var), Camille Alaphilippe’s huge bronze from Philippeville now stands in a Toulouse cemetery, and Maurice Favre’s sculpture of two ‘native’ soldiers from Mostaganem was relocated to Montpellier. A monument aux morts from Mascara was moved to Saint-Raphaël in Var and, in 1971, rededicated to all of the French from overseas territories who died for the motherland. In some cases, only elements of monuments, rather than entire structures, were ‘repatriated’ and incorporated into metropolitan monuments – a statue of a soldier from Mondovi was added to the memorial in Éragny-sur-Oise (Val-d’Oise), and a stela from Philippeville commemorating the victims of shelling by a German ship in 1914 was added to a monument in Versailles. see http://crid1418.org/doc/textes/aldrich.pdf)

== Other works ==
=== "Repentir" or "Le remords" ===
This plaster statue dates to 1933 and is held in Poitiers' Musée Sainte-Croix. The bronze version is located in the St-Vincent garden by the Tour Lacataye.

=== Hercules and the Cretian bull ===
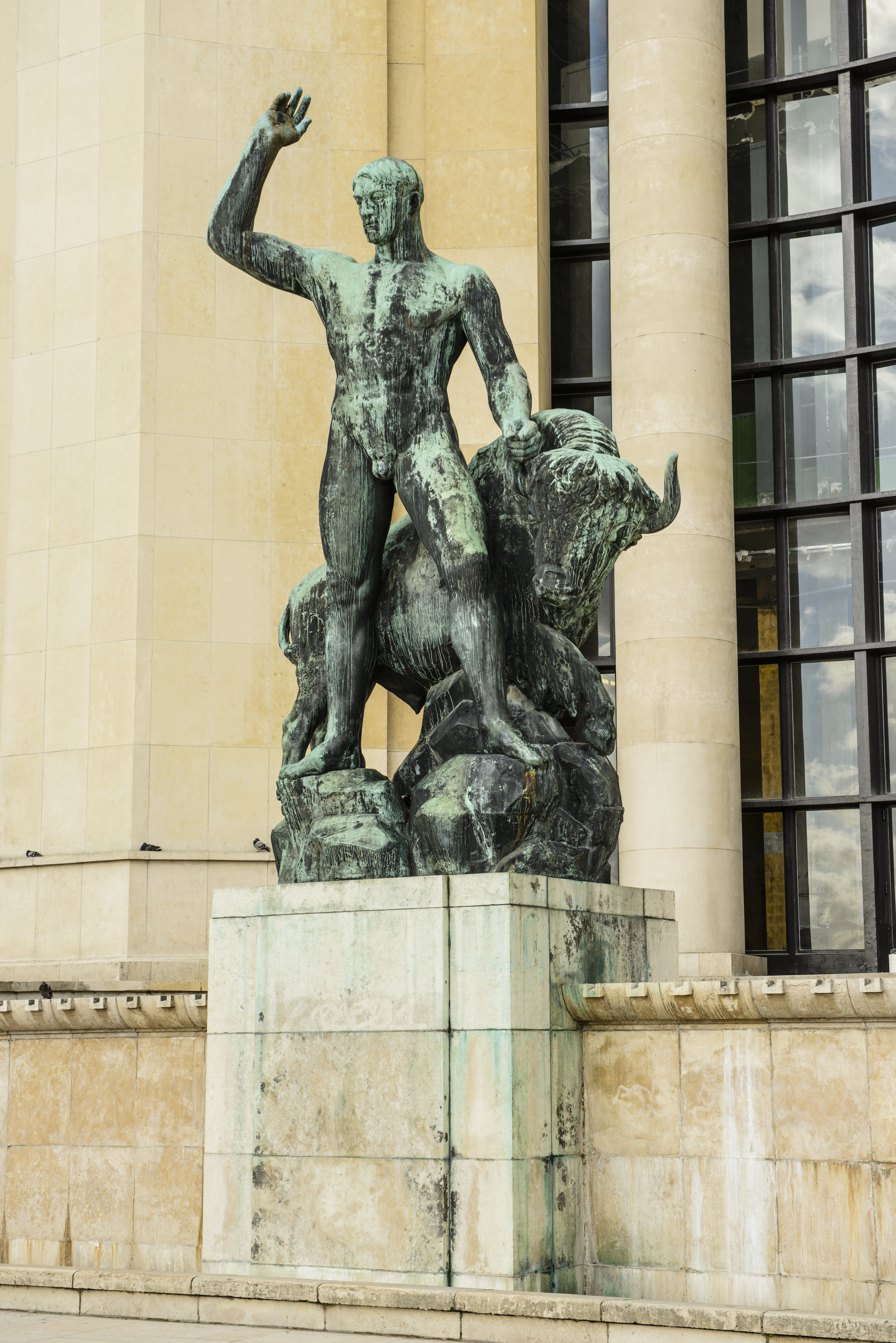
Albert Pommier's Hercules and the Cretian bull

This prize winning bronze work dates to 1937 and was commissioned for the 1937 Paris Exhibition Exposition Internationale des Arts et Techniques dans la Vie Moderne and placed on the main terrace of the Palais de Chaillot gardens. A plaster working model is held in Poitiers' Musee Sainte-Croix.

=== The bronze relief medallion "Nu" ===
This work by Pommier is held by the Bourg-en-Bresse Musée de Brou.

=== The statue "Pomone" in Cambrai's Jardin aux fleurs ===
This statue, thought to date to 1946, can be seen in this public park in Cambrai.

=== Bust of Mademoiselle Cesbron ===
This work in bronze is held in Bordeaux' Musée des Beaux-Arts.

=== Decoration on the "Normandie" ===
Pommier executed a large bas-relief for the ocean liner's "Deauville" suite.

=== "Tête de jeune fille" ===
A version of this composition is held in Cholet's Musée d'art.

== Medals ==
Pommier was an accomplished medallist. "La corvée de pain" in bronze was just one example.
