= Houplain =

Houplain is a surname. Notable people with the surname include:

- Jacques Houplain (1920–2020), French painter and engraver
- Jules Houplain (born 1999), French actor
- Myriane Houplain (born 1947), French politician
