= Charles Dufresne =

French painter

Charles Georges Dufresne
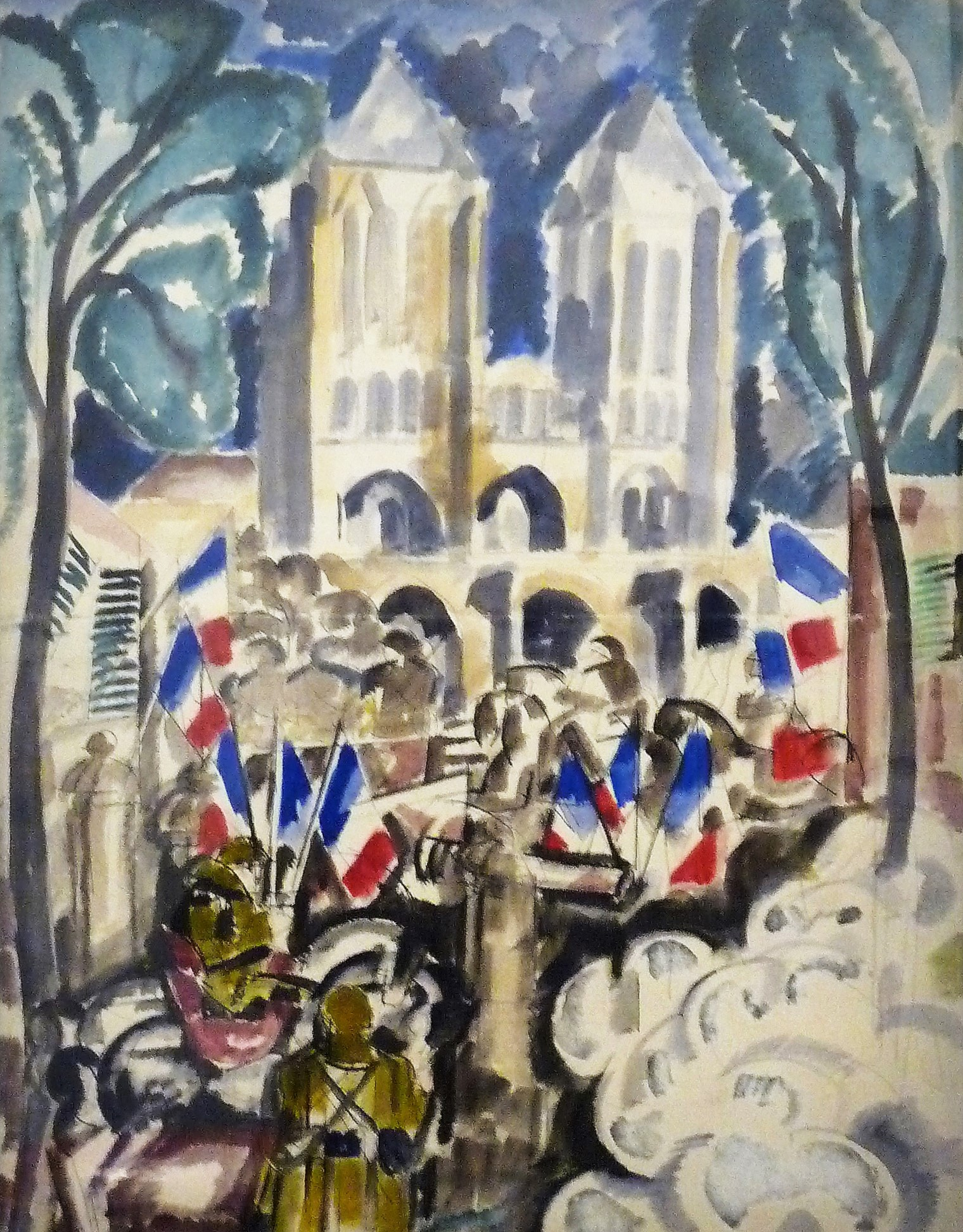
- Noyon, painting by Dufresen, 1917
- Born: 23 November 1876; Millemont, France
- Died: 8 August 1936 (aged 59); La Seyne-sur-Mer, France
- Education: École nationale supérieure des Beaux-Arts, Paris
- Known for: Painter, draughtsman, sculptor and print-maker
- Movement: Orientalist

Georges-Charles Dufresne (23 November 1876, Millemont - 8 August 1938, La Seyne-sur-Mer) was a French painter, engraver, sculptor and decorator.

== Biography ==
He came from a family of sailors and fishermen that originated in Granville. He left school to study engraving, then went to Paris, where he enrolled at the École nationale supérieure des Beaux-Arts and found a position in the workshops of Hubert Ponscarme. Later, he became an assistant to the sculptor and medalist, Alexandre Charpentier.

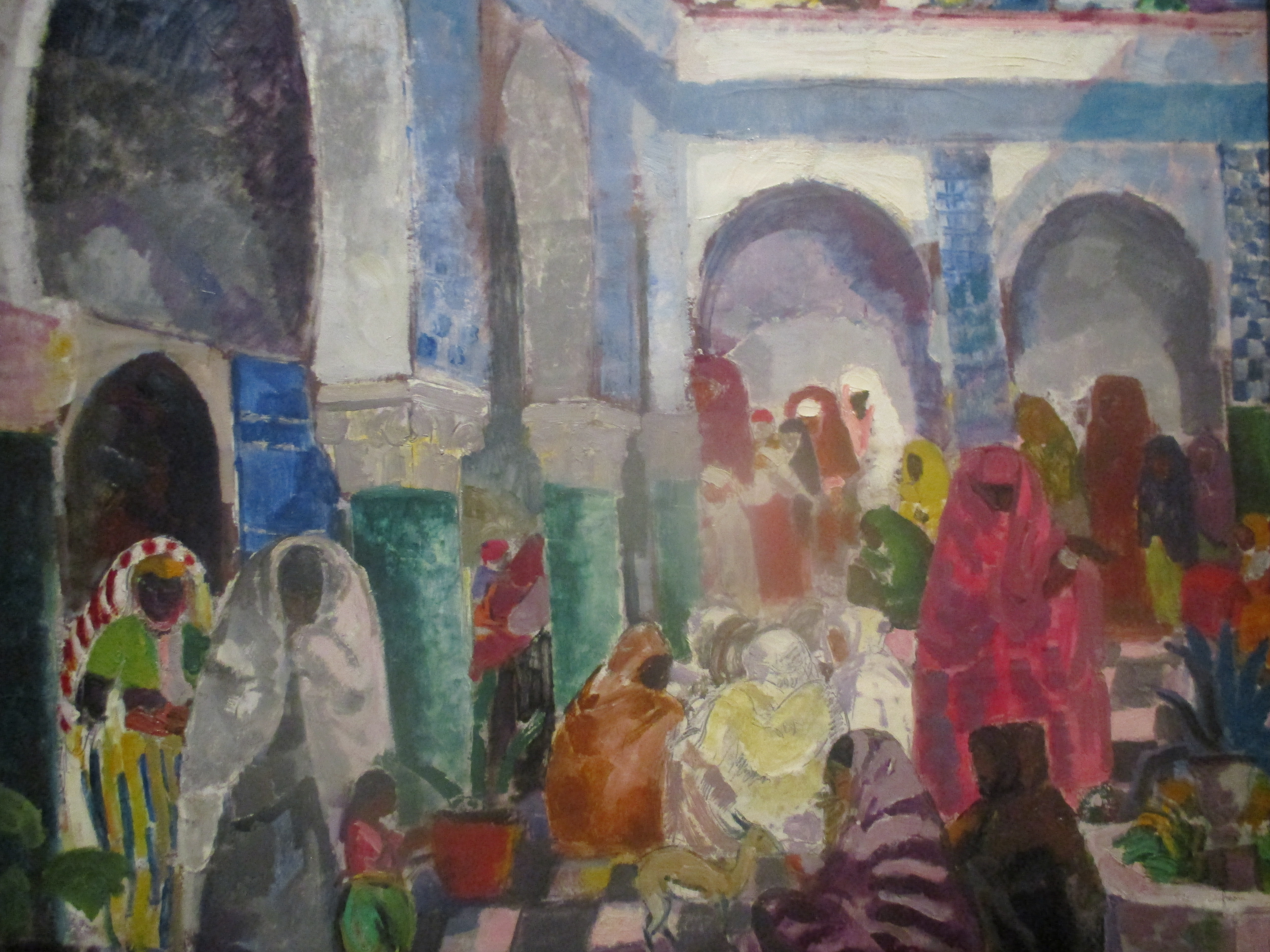
Patio in Algiers

He was more attracted to painting, however, and began making pastels at Café-chantants and circuses and guinguettes, in the manner of Toulouse-Lautrec. His first exhibition came at the Salon of the Société Nationale des Beaux-Arts in 1903. Following that, he and his close friend, the American-born engraver Herbert Lespinasse, went on an extended trip to Italy and stayed at the Villa Médicis. In 1908, he spent some time working in Brittany at the invitation of Jean Frélaut.

In 1910, he was one of the winners of the Abd-el-Tif prize and spent two years at the Villa Abd-el-Tif in Algiers, where he turned from pastels to oil painting. After returning, he opened a studio and produced numerous Orientalist works.

He was mobilized at the beginning of World War I. After being gassed, he was transferred to the Section de Camouflage, under the command of an old acquaintance, the painter André Dunoyer de Segonzac. During this time, he managed to paint some Cubist scenes of the war.

In 1921, Jacques Rouché, director of the Opéra de Paris, commissioned him to design sets for Antar, a ballet by Henri Caïn with music by Gabriel Dupont. Two years later, he was one of the founders of the Salon des Tuileries. Between 1921 and 1923, on a commission from Louis Süe and André Mare (whom he had met while in the camouflage section), he created tapestry designs on the theme of Paul et Virginie, for use as Art Deco furniture coverings. The completed ensemble, using new weaving techniques, was presented at the International Exhibition of Modern Decorative and Industrial Arts in 1925.

In the late 1920s, he became a teacher at the "Académie scandinave", an art school established with Scandinavian patronage that operated from 1919 to 1935. In 1936, he created more tapestry designs for the Mobilier National. That same year, he painted decorations in the foyer of the Palais de Chaillot. His last commission, completed just before his death, involved five large murals for the "Faculté de pharmacie de Paris", a division of Paris Descartes University. A major retrospective of his work was presented at the Venice Biennale shortly after his death.

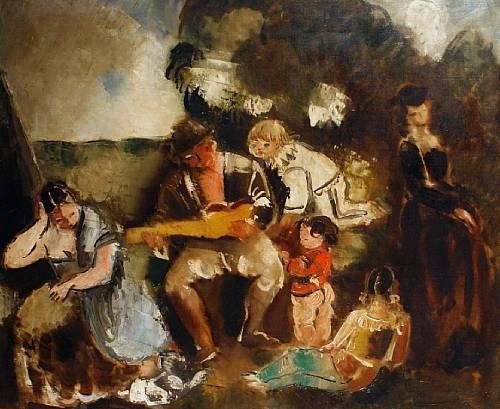
The Concert

== See also ==
- List of Orientalist artists
- Orientalism
