= Casa de Velázquez =

French school in Madrid, Spain

Coordinates: 40°26′27.84″N 3°43′47.51″W

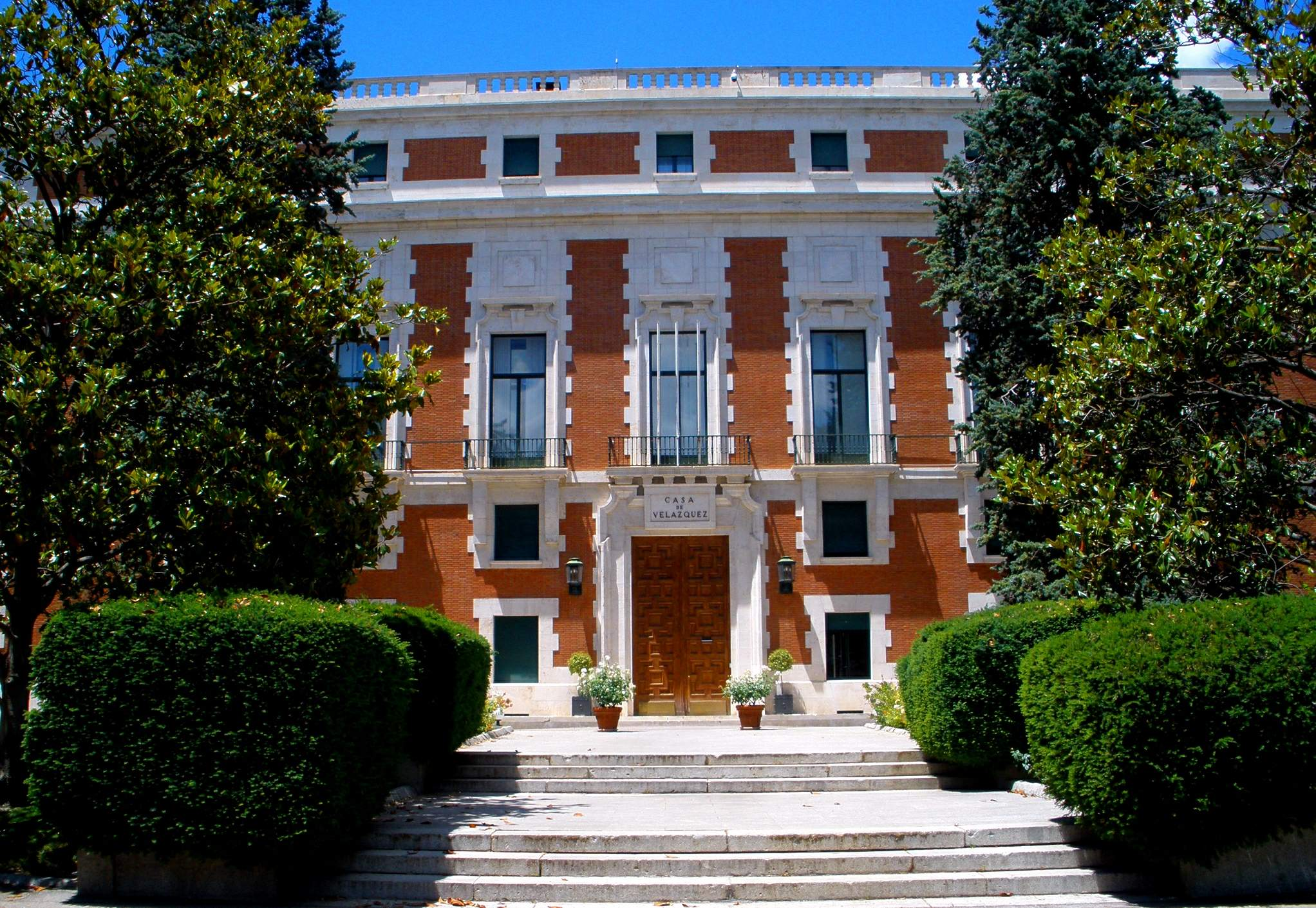
Southeast façade of the Casa de Velázquez

The Casa de Velázquez is a French school in Spain modelled on the Villa Médicis in Rome, and Villa Abd-el-Tif in Algeria. Like the Prix de Rome bursary for residence at the Villa Médicis and the defunct Prix Abd-el-Tif bursary for residence at the Villa Abd-el-Tif, bursaries are awarded.

The idea for a similar villa in Spain was raised in 1916 by the composer Charles-Marie Widor who at the time was secretary of the Académie des Beaux-Arts of the Institut de France. The idea met with support of Alfonso XIII who himself selected a site in Madrid which was ceded to France. The Foundation was legally founded in 1920, adapted by the architect Léon Chifflot, and opened for the first French artists in 1929. The villa was further enlarged by architect Camille Lefèvre (1876-1946) up to 1935. It was built in a Spanish Golden Age revival style, with a clear inspiration from the works of architect Juan de Herrera. In November 1936, during the Civil War, the building was bombed and severely damaged due to its location on the frontline in the siege of Madrid. It was rebuilt in a simpler style in 1959, losing its characteristic Herrerian slate-covered towers.

The current director is Nancy Berthier.
