= Jules Migonney =

French painter (1876–1929)

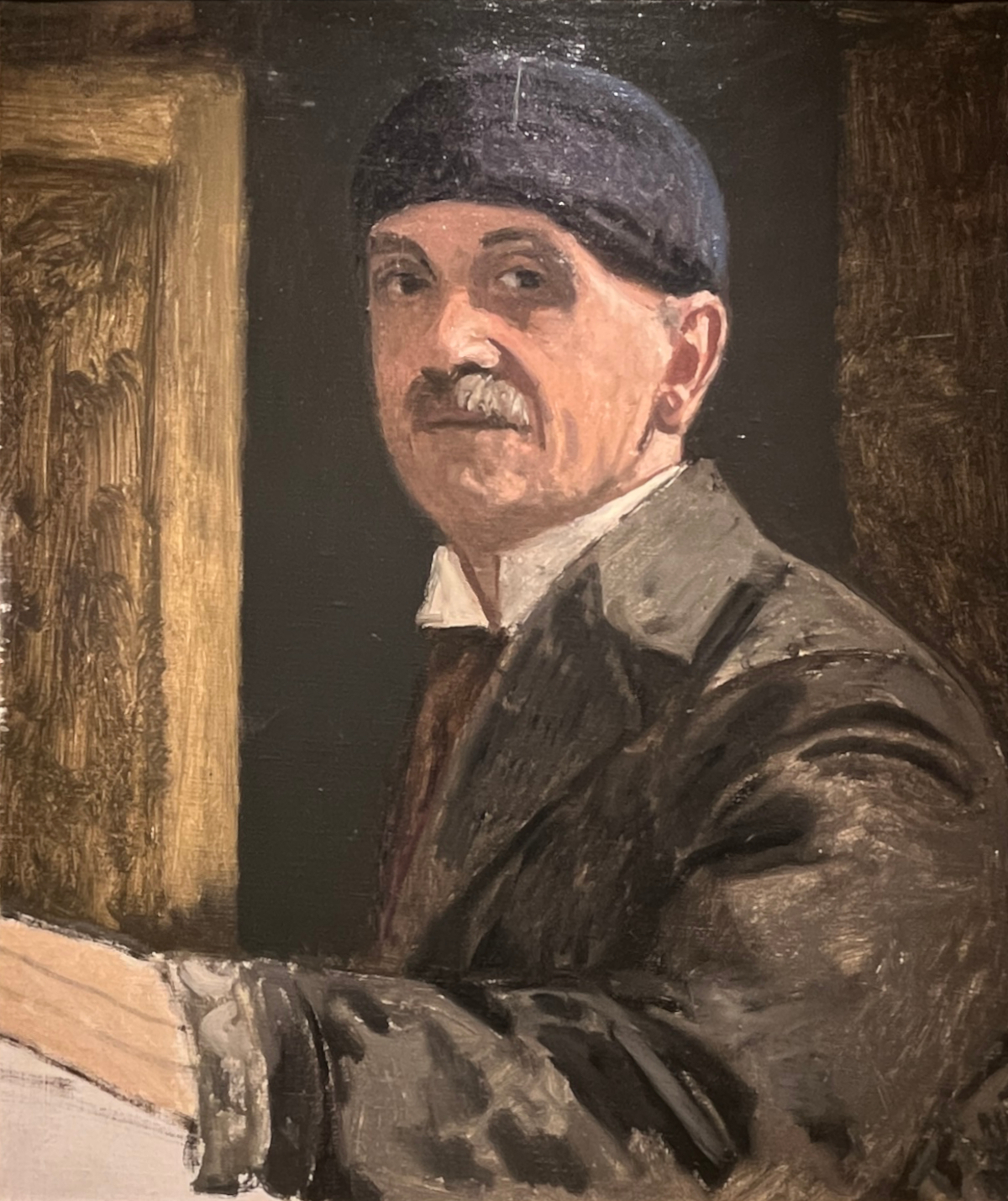
Unfinished self-portrait, 1929

Jules Migonney (22 February 1876 – 5 July 1929) was a French painter and engraver known for his portraits and Orientalist scenes.

== Life and work ==
He was born in Bourg-en-Bresse. His parents were originally from Ornans. After completing his studies at the prestigious Lycée Lalande in his hometown, he enrolled at the École nationale des beaux-arts de Lyon, where he was a student of Jean-Baptiste Poncet. He then studied with Léon Bonnat in Paris, and worked in the studios of Eugène Carrière. He also collaborated with Léon Carré, Charles Dufresne and Léon Cauvy.

In 1909, he was awarded the Abd-el-Tif prize. From 1909 to 1911, and again from 1912 to 1924, he travelled throughout Algeria; being best remembered for his scenes portraying the people and places of Kabylie and his studies of Moorish culture. His work was interrupted from 1914 to 1918, when he served in the French Army, and there is a distinct difference in his pre- and post-war styles, the latter being more subtle.

After 1925, his health began to decline, and he became increasingly dissatisfied with his work. He committed suicide in Paris in 1929, leaving a note that said "J'ai tout sacrifié à l'art, il me tue" ("I sacrificed everything to art, it has killed me").

Many of his works may be seen at museums in Algiers, Bourg-en-Bresse, and at the Centre Georges-Pompidou.

== Selected paintings ==
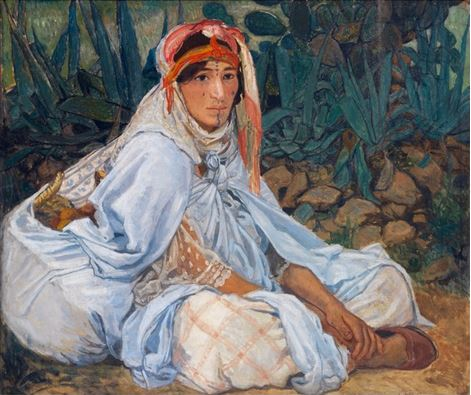
A Kabyle Woman

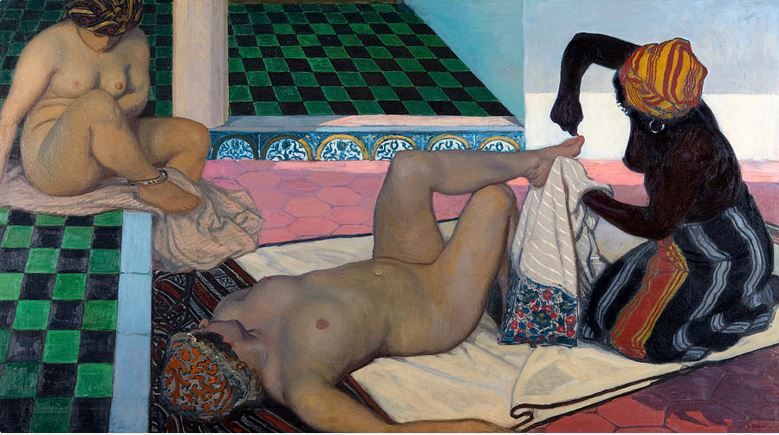
Moorish Bath, 1911

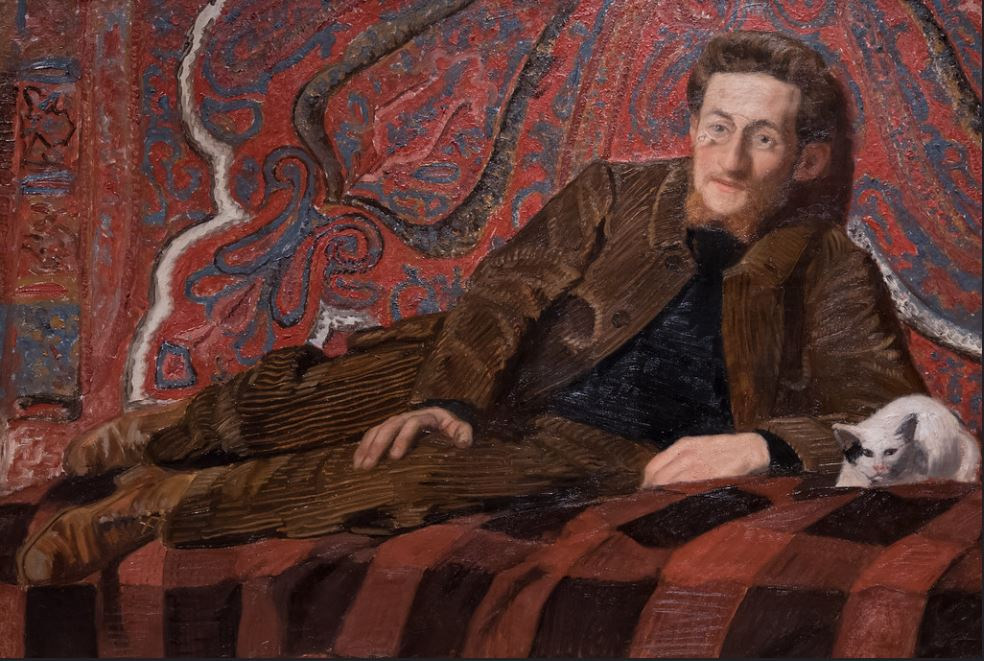
Portrait of the painter, Jean Puy, c. 1910

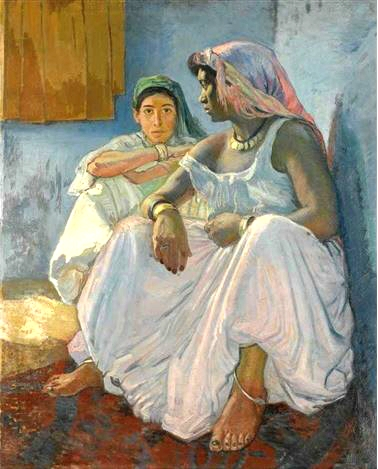
Two Berber Women, 1910

== Sources ==
- Tristan Klingsor, "Jules Migonney", In: l'Art et les Artistes, Paris, January, 1926
- Léon Deshairs, Jules Migonney, Paris, Éditions Albert Levy, 1931
- Élisabeth Cazenave, La Villa Abd el Tif, un demi-siècle de vie artistique en Algérie, Association Abd el-Tif, 1998 pgs. 280–284, ISBN 2-9509861-1-0
- Élisabeth Cazenave, Les Artistes de l'Algérie, dictionnaire des peintres, sculpteurs, graveurs, 1830–1962, Bernard Giovanangeli Éditeur, 2001 ISBN 978-2-909034-27-0
