= Frédéric Zaavy =

French jeweller (1964 – 2011)

- Born: October 9, 1964; Paris
- Died: September 15, 2011 (aged 46)
- Education: École des Arts Appliqués, École des Beaux-Arts
- Occupation: Jeweller
- Years active: 1994–2011

Frédéric Zaavy (9 October 1964 – 15 September 2011) was a Parisian jeweller. He created his most famous pieces for the Fabergé brand.

== Biography ==
Frédéric Zaavy was born in Paris on October 9, 1964. He was the third generation of a family of diamond merchants. After a classic French education during which he undertook courses at several art schools including the École des Arts Appliqués and the École des Beaux-Arts, he decided not to enter the family business. He traveled to Canada, Québec in 1981, living the poet life. Married Aline Beaupré, a visual artist living in the country side and had 3 children from her: Jérôme Zaavy, Iris Léa Zaavy and Raphaël Zaavy. He later on, studied gemology in California.

After travelling the world and becoming a gemstone dealer in 1994 he decided to turn towards high-class jewellery design. Together with his Taiwanese partner Lisa Chen, they formed the Daring jewellery company based out of the Far East. Later he relocated back to Paris permanently, where he employed several other jewellers and stonesetters in his atelier, splitting from Chen.

In May 2007 Phillips de Pury & Company announced that it would stage Zaavy’s first major exhibition of his work in the US, titled Nymphéas. The exhibition featured thirty pieces of jewellery with highlights being previewed from 10 to 25 May in London and the main exhibition in Manhattan being held from October 22 through to November 2, 2007.

In January 2007 Pallinghurst Resources announced it had acquired Unilever’s entire global portfolio of trademarks, licenses and associated rights relating to the Fabergé brand name. Later it announced the reunification of the Fabergé name with the family. Tatiana and Sarah Fabergé, both great-granddaughters of Peter Carl Fabergé, had become founder members of the Fabergé Heritage Council that was to counsel the unified Fabergé in its pursuit of excellence and creativity.

Frédéric Zaavy became the exclusive jeweller for Fabergé on April 22, 2008. He was appointed the first Fabergé work master since the Russian Revolution. Fabergé secured the copyright to 45 of Zaavy’s existing pieces as well as the 55 further pieces it commissioned from him. The 100 pieces in the Fabergé relaunch collection ranged from USD 40,000 to USD 7 million.

Later that year he had to be treated for cancer. But in 2011 the cancer returned. Zaavy died on 15 September 2011.
