= Catherine Bouroche =

French sculptor

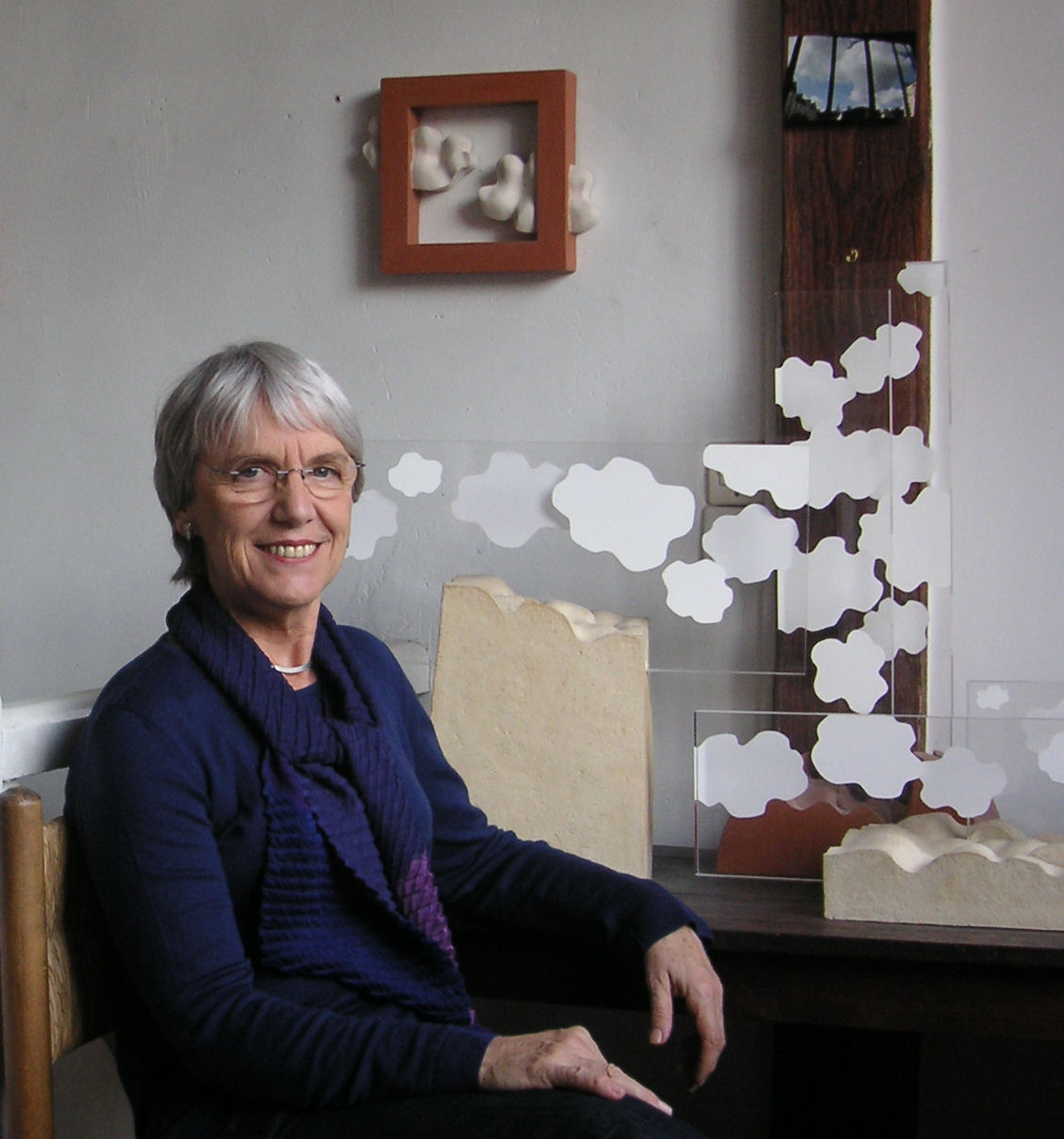
- Born: 21 May 1942; Casteljaloux, Lot-et-Garonne, France
- Died: 11 December 2015 (aged 73); Nanteuil-lès-Meaux, France
- Occupation: Sculptor

Catherine Bouroche (21 May 1942 – 11 December 2015) was a French sculptor.

== Biography ==
Catherine Bouroche was born in Casteljaloux, Lot-et-Garonne on May 21, 1942. She graduated from the École nationale supérieure des arts appliqués et des métiers d'art in Paris in 1964. She started her career as a sculptor in 1992. She presented his works in various salons such as Salon de Mai, the Young Sculptors and Salon de Montrouge.

== Selected solo exhibitions ==
- 2011 : Galerie Toutes latitudes, Vincennes.
- 2006 : Galerie Toutes latitudes, Vincennes.
- 2003 : mac2000/macparis, Fresnes, France.
- 1999 : Reims habitat, Reims, France
- 1998 : Galerie Delfi Form, Zwolle, Netherlands
- 1996 : Galerie Babel, Amsterdam, Netherlands.
