= Exoticism =

Trend in art and design

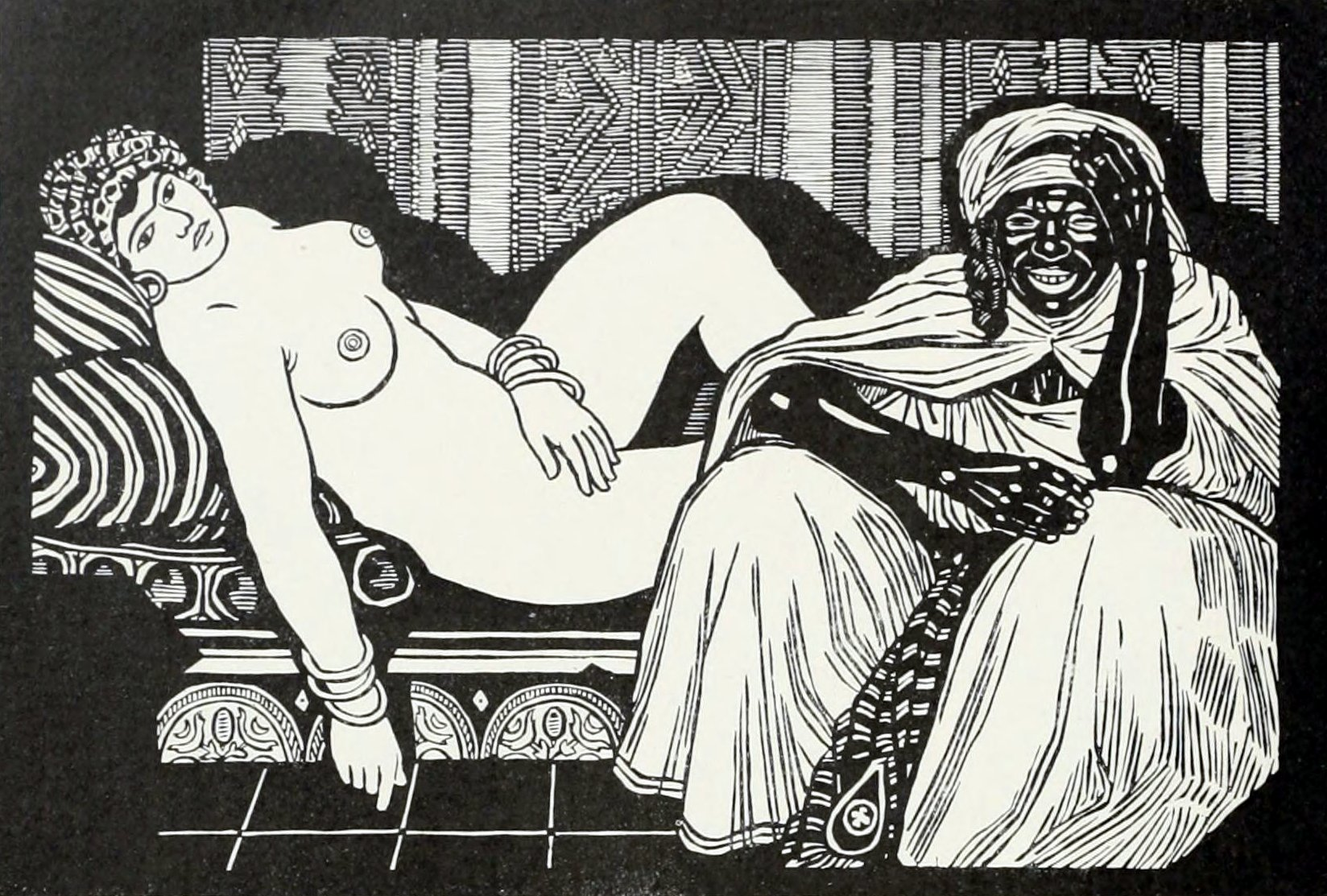
Exotic figures in Jules Migonney's Venus mauresque

Exoticism (from exotic) is the style or traits considered characteristic of a distant foreign country. In art and design it is a trend where creators become fascinated with ideas and styles from distant regions and draw inspiration from them. This often involves surrounding foreign cultures with mystique and fantasy which owe more to the culture of the people doing the exoticism than to the exotic cultures themselves: this process of glamorisation and stereotyping is called "exoticisation".

In a colonial context, it is the romanticisation or fetishisation of ethnic, racial, or cultural others, where the group is marked by difference.

== History of exoticism ==
The word exotic is rooted in the Greek word exo 'outside' and means, literally, 'from outside'. It was coined during Europe's Age of Discovery, when "outside" seemed to grow larger each day, as Western ships sailed the world and dropped anchor off other continents. The first definition of exotic in most modern dictionaries is 'foreign', but while all things exotic are foreign, not everything foreign is exotic. Since there is no outside without an inside, the foreign only becomes exotic when imported – brought from the outside in. From the early 17th century, "exotic" has denoted enticing strangeness – or, as one modern dictionary puts it, "the charm or fascination of the unfamiliar".

First stimulated by Eastern trade in the 16th and 17th centuries, interest in non-western (particularly Oriental, i.e. Middle Eastern or Asian) art by Europeans became more and more popular with the rise of European colonialism.

The influences of Exoticism can be seen through numerous genres of this period, notably in music, painting, and decorative art. In music, exoticism is a genre in which the patterns, notes, or instrumentation are designed to feel like the audience is in exotic places or old times (e.g., Ravel's Daphnis et Chloé and Tzigane, Debussy's Syrinx, or Rimsky-Korsakov's Capriccio espagnol). Like orientalist subjects in 19th-century painting, exoticism in the decorative arts and interior decoration was associated with fantasies of opulence.

Exoticism, by one definition, is "the charm of the unfamiliar". Scholar Alden Jones defines exoticism in art and literature as the representation of one culture for consumption by another. Victor Segalen's important "Essay on Exoticism" reveals Exoticism as born of the age of imperialism, possessing both aesthetic and ontological value, while using it to uncover a significant cultural "otherness". An important and archetypical exoticist is the artist and writer Paul Gauguin, whose visual representations of Tahitian people and landscapes were targeted at a French audience. While exoticism is closely linked to Orientalism, it is not a movement necessarily associated with a particular time period or culture. Exoticism may take the form of primitivism, ethnocentrism, or humanism.

Jean-Auguste-Dominique Ingres (1780–1867) was a French Neoclassical painter. The revival of ancient Greek and Roman art left behind the academy's emphasis on naturalism and incorporated an idealism not seen since the Renaissance. As classicism progressed, Ingres identified a newfound idealism and exoticism in his work. Grand Odalisque, finished in 1814, was created to arouse the male view. The notion of the exotic figure furthers Ingres' use of symmetry and line by enabling the eye to move cohesively across the canvas. Although Ingres' intention was to make the woman beautiful in his work, his model was a courtesan, which aroused debate.

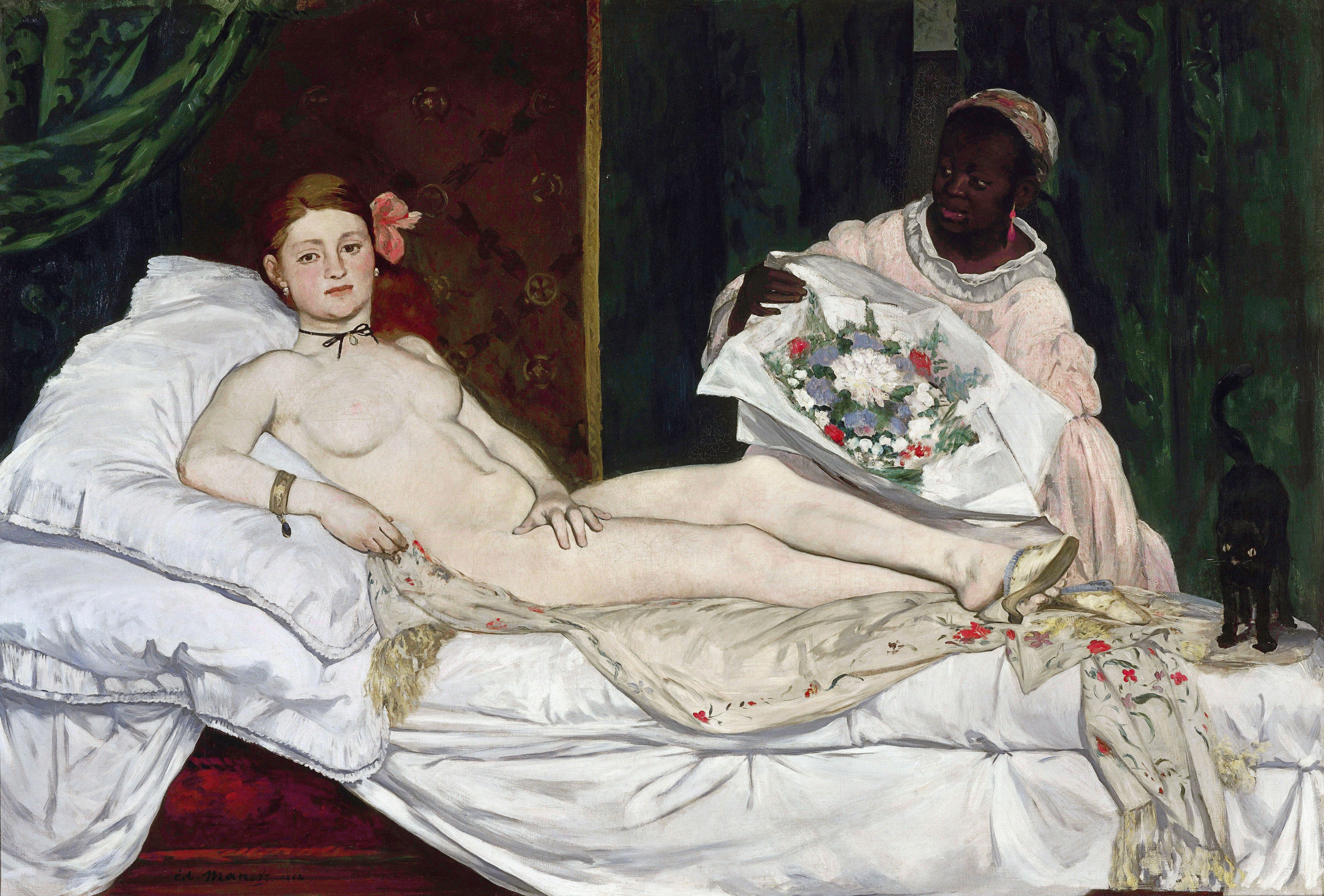
Olympia by Manet

Édouard Manet's Olympia, finished in 1863, was based on Titian's Venus of Urbino. Olympia was a popular play about a courtesan of that name. The painting diverged scandalously from the accepted academic style by outlining the figure and flattening space to draw the viewer in: Olympia seems provocatively naked rather than classically nude. Looking out boldly, she puts the viewer in the position of a man coming to a prostitute, although the placement of her hand suggests coyness.

Particularly following the publication of Edward Said's book Orientalism, exoticism has become a key term in political assessments of the encounter between Euro-America and the non-Western world and more broadly of any center and a periphery. As recent anthropological enquiries suggest, terms such as Orientalism and exoticism have been at times simplistically applied to merely equate the interest in the Other with the attribution of negative qualities. A study of the sphere of Othering in contexts, such as the relationship between Greece and Germany during the sovereign debt crisis years and the art show Documenta14 may point to volatile ingredients in "exoticism", including fascination mixed with condescension, aversion, admiration and hopes for an escape from an oppressive northern European lifestyle. Similarly, tourism and intra-national relations between urban centers and rural peripheries are spheres where exoticizing dynamics are at a play, even if, as noted above, these dynamics may well involve the ambivalence of the spectators, and also the involvement of those represented in reproducing, and at times contesting the stereotypes of those who represent others.

== See also ==
- Chinoiserie
- Objectification
- Romantic racism
- Racial fetishism
- Xenocentrism
