= Jacques Houplain =

French painter and engraver (1920–2020)

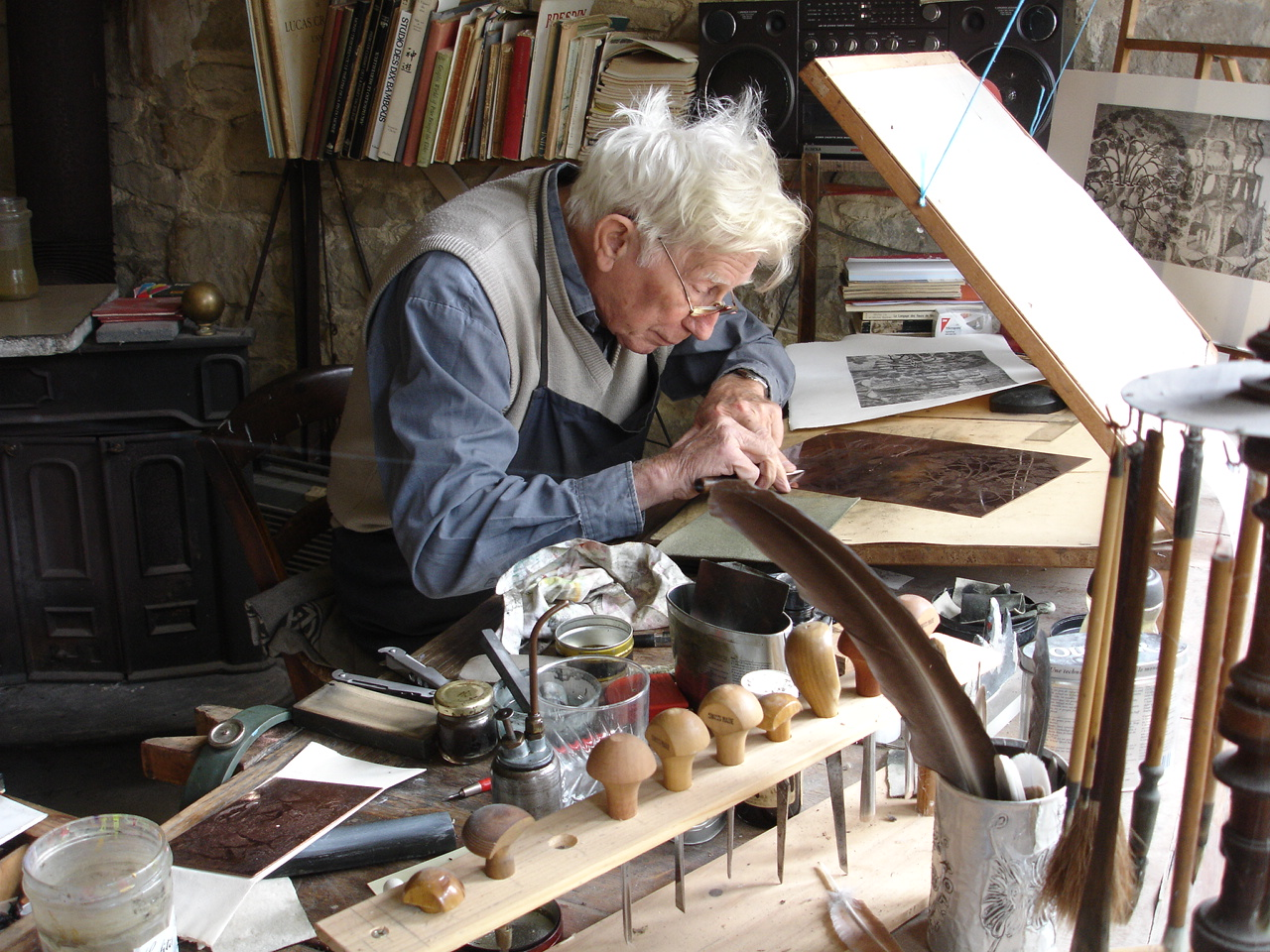
- Houplain in 2007
- Born: 10 September 1920; Luneray, France
- Died: 22 February 2020 (aged 99); Limoux, France
- Occupation: Painter

Jacques Houplain (10 September 1920 – 22 February 2020) was a French painter and engraver.

== Biography ==
Houplain was born in Luneray, but spent most of his childhood in Paris. He attended the École nationale supérieure des Beaux-Arts, and after hiding from the German Occupation for three years, graduated in 1945. He was then invited to the La jeune gravure contemporaine society's exposition at Galerie Sagot - Le Garrec in Paris. The following year, he joined the society and began showing exhibitions at the Salon des moins de trente. He was invited to an exhibition of the Société des peintres-graveurs français at the Bibliothèque nationale de France, and created stained glass for Louis Barillet.

Along with engraving and painting, Houplain studied art history. He was a fellow at the Maison Descartes in Amsterdam, and he studied the work of Hercules Seghers and his influences on Rembrandt. Houplain wrote his thesis on this subject.

Houplain studied at the École Estienne on how to produce books. This helped boost his career, as he was able to publish his illustrations. He won the Abd-el-Tif prize in 1949 and stayed in Algeria for the two following years. Upon his return to France, Houplain began teaching art history at the École nationale supérieure des arts appliqués et des métiers d'art while continuing his work as an engraver. In 1956, Houplain became a permanent member of the Société des peintres-graveurs français and met Kiyoshi Hasegawa, who became a lifelong friend to Houplain and was vastly important to his work.

Jacques Houplain died on 22 February 2020 at the age of 99.

== Illustrations ==
- Chants de Maldoror (1947)
- Genèse (1949)
- Poésies (1952)
- Odes amoureuses (1953)
- La Clef des champs (1957)
- Éloge du poème (1959)
- Rendez-Vous (1974)
- Lieux des Crépuscules retrouvés (1989)
- Masks (1994)

== Publications ==
- Rêveries d'un graveur solitaire (2010)
