= Serge Mouille =

French designer

Serge Mouille (24 December 1922 – 1988) was a French industrial designer and goldsmith. He is best known for his light fixture designs.

== Biography ==
He was born and raised in a popular part of Paris. At the age of 13 he was admitted to the École des Arts Appliqués. His area of study was metallurgy and he earned a diploma in silversmithing.

After having worked a few years in the workshop of Gilbert Lacroix, he opened his own workshop in 1945 with the intention of creating silverware utensils.

In 1953 he began researching and designing light fixtures. During this period he was also supervising the gold smithing department at l'École des Arts Appliqués. In 1955 he was inducted into the Société des Artistes Décorateurs ("the Interior Decorators' Society").

The following year, Steph Simon opened a design gallery at 145 Bd St Germain in Paris. Displaying the work of Charlotte Perriand and Jean Prouvé, the gallery soon also featured the work of Serge Mouille, Isamu Noguchi, and Jean Luce. The designs of these artists soon become more widely known thanks to orders placed by institutions such as, Cité universitaire d’Antony, University of Strasbourg, University of Aix-Marseille, and Centre d’essais en vol de Brétigny.

Serge Mouille suffered from tuberculosis for many years, and in 1959 he was forced to suspend his design activities and undergo treatment.

In 1961, thanks to the Société de Création des Modèles, he was able to exhibit his latest light fixture designs at the trade show Salon des arts ménagers. These designs combined the concepts of fluorescence and incandescence.

Production of his light fixtures stopped definitively in 1961.

Serge Mouille remains famous primarily for his minimalistic designs and use of uniformly black painted metal materials. His wall-mounted spot light fixture with articulated arms is typical for his discrete, yet highly functional designs.
