= Jean-Yves Blondeau =

French designer (born 1970)

- Born: June 1, 1970 (age 56); Aix-les-Bains, France
- Other name: Rollerman
- Education: École nationale supérieure des arts appliqués et des métiers d'art
- Occupation: Designer
- Known for: Inventing the 32-wheel roller suit
- Parent(s): Paul Blondeau; Micheline Blondeau
- Website: www.buggy-rollin.com

Jean-Yves Blondeau (born June 1, 1970), also known as Rollerman, is a French designer who is best known for inventing the 32-wheel roller suit.

== Biography ==
Blondeau was born in Aix-les-Bains, Savoy, France to Paul Blondeau and Micheline Blondeau. He has four brothers and a sister.

== Buggy rollin ==
Blondeau is the inventor of the 32-wheel roller suit (also known as the wheel suit or buggy rollin). This suit features rollers similar to those found on rollerblades on major joints, the torso, and the back. The wearer can ride downhill in a variety of positions (upright, prone, supine, on all fours, etc.) at speeds of up to 78 mph (126 km/h). The buggy rollin wheel suit can be used on any surface suitable for roller skates.

Blondeau built the roller suit as part of his graduation project at the industrial design school École nationale supérieure des arts appliqués et des métiers d'art (also known as the Olivier de Serres) in Paris. The study theme was: "systems that underline the sensations caused by the displacement of the human center of gravity in relation to support points in order to move into space". The research phase lasted for 6 months, followed by 1 month of synthesis and 2 months for producing the prototype. Then followed a year of secret patent application writing, finally published in June 1995.

Since then, six generations of buggy-rollins have been created. They include variations from the most basic kneepad with rollers to the most sophisticated one called "Super Rollin Bionic Woman" (SURBO). The prototypes have evolved into safer, more comfortable and easier machines that can be adapted to all different morphologies.

Two of his suits can be seen in a short scene partway through the end credits of the 2008 Jim Carrey film Yes Man. Two other suits were featured in a commercial for Mennen filmed in South Africa and intended for distribution in South America in 2010. He also featured in a commercial for Megapass, a broadband telecommunication service in South Korea. In 2011 he took part in Stan Lee's Superhumans TV program. Blondeau trained Jackie Chan to use a roller suit in the 2012 film Chinese Zodiac.

== See also ==
- Inline speed skating
- Road skating
