= Malika Favre =

French illustrator

- Born: December 1, 1982 (age 43); Paris region, France
- Education: Olivier de Serres; Surrey Institute of Art & Design
- Style: Pop Art; Op Art
- Website: malikafavre.com

Malika Favre (born 14 December 1982) is a French illustrator and graphic artist based in Barcelona. Her style of works could be characterized by pure minimalism within Pop art and Op art, where it sometimes described as 'Pop Art meets Op Art'. She combines simple illustrations with geometric patterns and has developed a unique style of illustration by using positive and negative space and colours, elegant layouts, especially of the female body and its curves.

== Early life and education ==
Malika Favre was born on 14 December 1982 in the Paris region, France, and grew up there. Her mother was a painter. After high school Favre went to a science prep school because she thought that she wanted to become a quantic engineer. But later decided to enroll in École nationale supérieure des arts appliqués et des métiers d'art, which is often known as Olivier de Serres. She graduated from Olivier de Serres, and moved to London, to study illustration at Surrey Institute of Art & Design, University College in Farnham.

== Career ==
Start your engines, cover of Arab News by Malika Favre in 2018.

Favre's art "Behind the Lens", cover of The New Yorker, February 2020

Favre did an internship for three months at Airside, a British design studio which closed in 2012. In 2006, she started work as an Art Director at Airside, which led to collaborations with numerous high-profile magazines and clients including wallpaper and The Sunday Times. She also worked for UNIT9 in 2006. In 2011 she left Airside to set herself up as an independent illustrator.

== Works ==
Favre is an independent illustrator and has worked on a variety of projects spanning editorial, advertising and publishing. Her unique graphics style, mixing Pop and Op art, is featured by companies such as Sephora, Le Bon Marché, Penguin Books, and newspapers such as Vogue, The New York Times, The New Yorker, The Sunday Times, and Vanity Fair.

In 2017, she created the poster artwork for the Montreux Jazz Festival, and continued to work with the festival in subsequent years.

In 2021, Favre illustrated the poster for Barcelona's annual La Mercè festival.

== Cover Illustrations ==
- With Bags and Swags: Around Australia in the Forties (2008, by Wendy Suart)
- London at home (2010, by Magda Segal)
- Kama Sutra (Penguin Classics Deluxe Edition), (2012, by Vatsyayana)
- When the Rains Come (2012, by Tom Pow)
- The Burgermat Show (2013, by Burgerac)
- Stickyscapes Paris (2015)
- Illustration: A Theoretical and Contextual Perspective (2017, by Alan Male)
- This Impossible Light (2017, by Lily Myers)
- Love by the Book (2017, by Melissa Pimentel)

== Publications ==
In October 2019, Malika Favre released her first monograph. Published in the UK by Counter-Print, it divides her work into seven key themes with commentary by the artist. In 2022, an expanded edition was published.

== See also ==
- Graphic arts
- Graphic design
- Pop art
- Op art
