= Roger Nivelt =

French painter

- Born: 30 August 1899; Paris, France
- Died: 1 June 1962 (aged 62); Tonnerre, France
- Occupation: Painter

Roger Nivelt (30 August 1899 – 1 June 1962) was a French painter. His work was part of the painting event in the art competition at the 1932 Summer Olympics.
