= Jean Bossu (architect) =

French architect (1912–1983)

Jean Bossu (17 May 1912 - 18 May 1983) was a French architect. He is best known for his work in Algeria and on La Réunion, where six of his buildings are now monuments historiques.

He was born in Nesles-la-Vallée and died in the 6th arrondissement of Paris.

== Main works ==
=== Algeria ===
- Saint-Réparatus shopping centre, Orléansville

=== La Réunion ===
==== Saint-Denis ====
- Direction de l'alimentation, de l'agriculture et de la forêt de La Réunion, monument historique ;
- Église Sainte-Clotilde;
- Immeuble Ah-Sing, monument historique ;
- Maison dite Bossu, monument historique ;
- Maison Drouhet, monument historique ;
- Poste centrale de Saint-Denis, monument historique.

==== Other ====
- Gendarmerie de Saint-Benoît, in Saint-Benoît, monument historique ;
- Lycée professionnel agricole de Saint-Joseph, in Saint-Joseph ;

== External links (in French) ==
- Fonds Bossu, Jean (1912-1983). 192 Ifa - ArchiWebture, base de données du Centre d'archives de l'Institut français d'architecture, Cité de l'architecture et du patrimoine
