= Henri Hamm =

French artist, designer, sculptor (1871-1961)

Henri Hamm (1871–1961) was an arts and button designer and sculptor. Apart from buttons, for which he was best known in Paris, he also designed belt buckles, horn combs, decorative boxes, flasks and furniture. He created using multiple materials, like ivory, bone, celluloid, Bakelite, mother of pearl, wood. His designs include floral and geometric forms, and use sculpture as the main technique. The buttons from his workshop are usually in very rich colours.

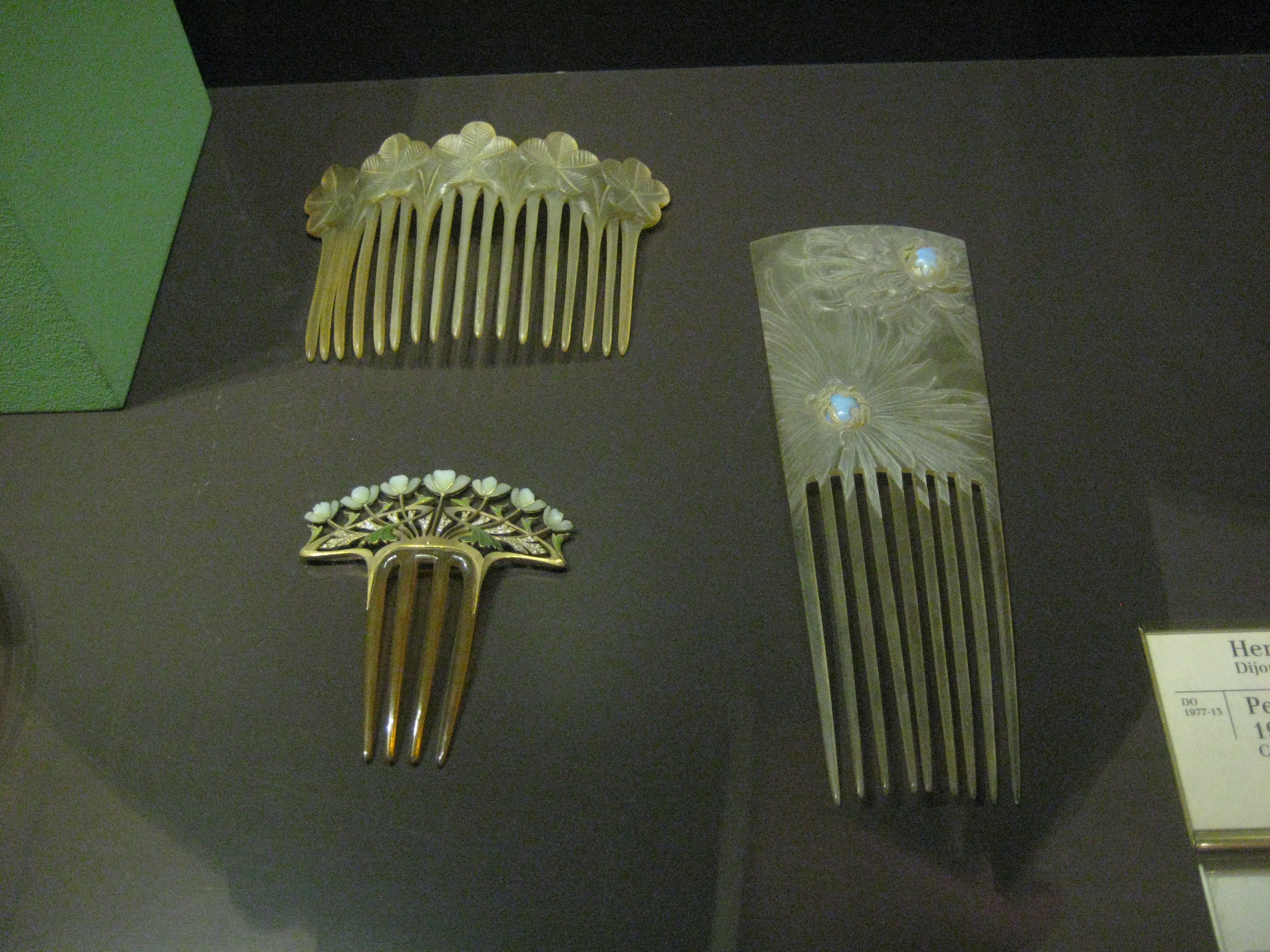
Henri Hamm haircombs

A huge collection of Hamm's buttons, designed between 1910 and 1920 were on display at Louvre special exhibition, Déboutonner a la mode (10/02/2015 – 19 July 2015).

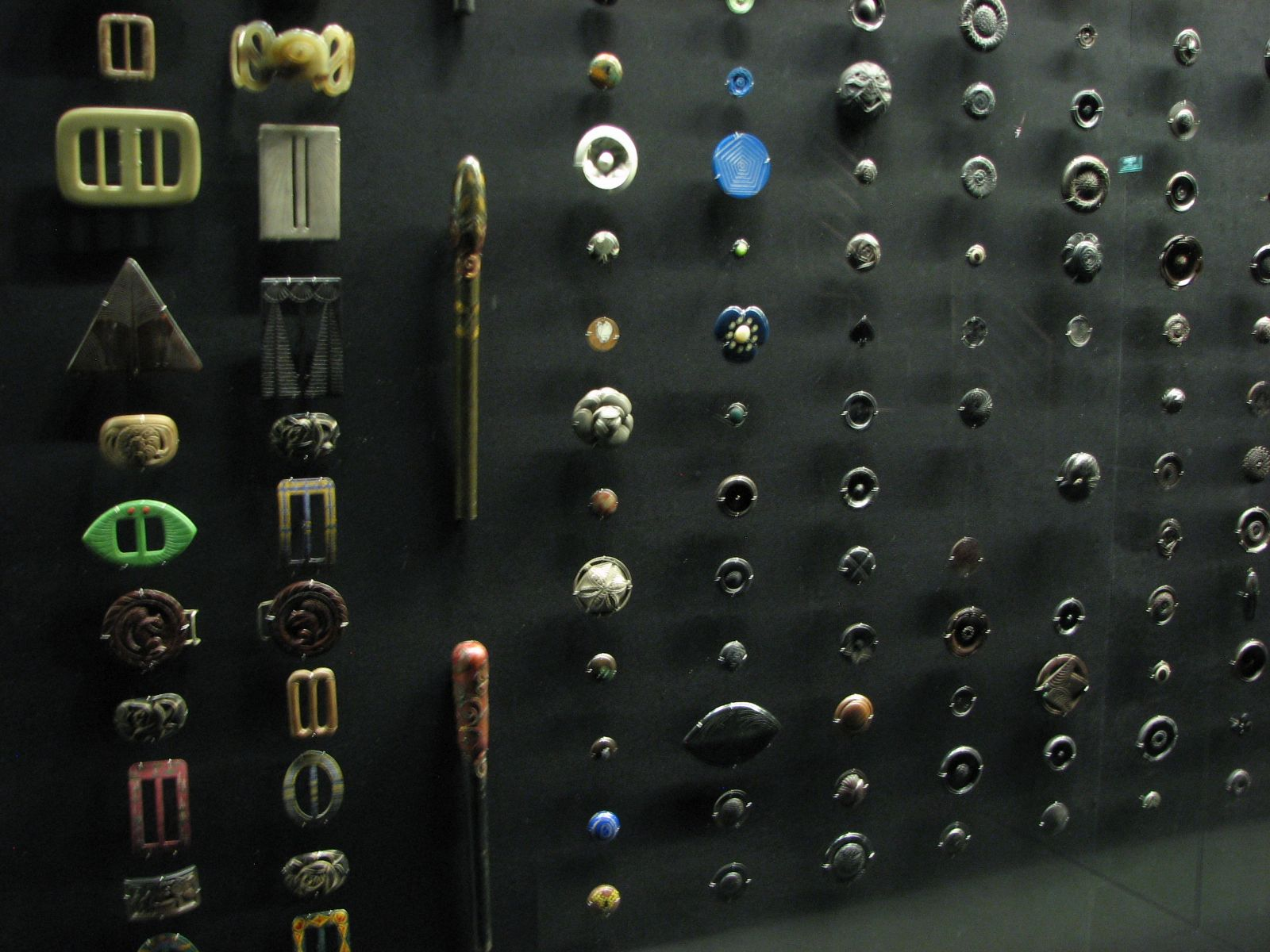
Henri Hamm buttons on display at Louvre

== Biography ==
Henri Hamm was born in 1871 in Bordeaux, France. He became famous in the early 20th century for his Perfume bottles designs. In 1897, when he was 26 he founded the Societé d'Art Moderne de Bordeaux. At the age of 54, in 1926, he became a professor at L'Ecole des Arts Appliqués. Throughout his life he worked with numerous designers, of which especially Jacques Doucet deserves a mention.
