= Jacques Denier =

French painter (1894–1983)

Jacques Denier (1894 – 1983) was a French painter.
