= André Hambourg =

French painter (1909–1999)

The artist André Hambourg (5 May 1909 – 4 December 1999) was a French painter of romantic compositions of Venice, luminous seascapes, and beach scenes.

== Biography ==
=== Education and early career ===
André Hambourg was born in Paris on 5 May 1909. Entering the Ecole Nationale Superieure des Arts Decoratifs in 1926, he studied sculpture under Paul Niclausse for four years. The young artist then entered the studio of Lucien Simon at the École nationale supérieure des Beaux-Arts. While in the middle of his academic studies, Hambourg had his debut solo exhibition at the Galerie Taureau in Paris in 1928. He was only 19 years old at the time. Because of the early recognition of his talent, Hambourg became active in the important Paris salons in the first stages of his developing career. In 1931, he was made a member of the Salon de l’Art Français Indépendant and the Salon de l’Oeuvre Unique.

=== Africa ===
The first of Hambourg’s many honors was the Prix de la Villa Abd-el-Tif, awarded in 1933. As a result, the artist traveled to North Africa for the first time, and would spend nearly ten years working in Algeria and Morocco. The powerful sunlight, as well as the bleak poverty of this region, inspired Hambourg’s canvases. In 1937, he executed a large mural for the Algerian Pavilion at the Exposition Internationale of Paris, earning the title of Laureate of the Exposition. Throughout his years in North Africa, Hambourg would exhibit his paintings in numerous one-man shows in Algeria, Oran and Paris. Eighty of his works were shown at such a show, at the Musée d’Outre-Mer in Paris in 1939.

=== Military service ===
In 1939, Hambourg was mobilized as a military reporter and draughtsman and worked on the staff of the Journal de Commissariat a la Guerre, the newspaper of the French army, under the pseudonym Andre Hache. Special missions on combat vessels led to his appointment as a war correspondent in 1944 with the staff of inter-allied SHAEF. In this role, he took part in the German, Alsace and Atlantic Front campaigns, as well as the liberation of France. In recognition of his wartime contributions, Hambourg was decorated with the Croix de Guerre. Before the end of the war, Hambourg became the first French delegate to the Four Arts Aid Society. For his aid to French artists during this time, Hambourg was made a Chevalier of the Ordre de la Sante Publique.

After returning to his artistic career for a short time, Hambourg became the official painter of the Navy in 1952. He undertook numerous voyages aboard French Navy vessels on missions all around the world including: Venice, the Soviet Union, Israel, Britain, the Ivory Coast, the United States, and Mexico. From these global travels, the artist brought back many sketches and preparatory drawings for future paintings and illustrations. His international trips would have a lasting influence on his artwork. Hambourg’s adventurous maritime career resulted in his receiving the honor of Laureate of the Salon de la Marine, and becoming the official painter of the Marine Ministry.

=== Late career ===
In 1970 five hundred of his works formed a prestigious retrospective at the Maison de Culture in Bourges. Other notable shows include Drawings of Venice at Galerie Varine-Gincourt in Paris (1979), Bonjour New York at Wally Findlay Galleries in New York (1985), The Presence of André Hambourg at the Salon du Dessin (1986), André Hambourg in the Ivory Coast at Galerie Guigne in Paris (1987), and finally André Hambourg in Venice at Galerie Apesteguyin Deauville (1989).

Having past experience creating mural decorations for ships, Hambourg was asked to complete a 195 square foot mural, for the Audience Chamber of the new European Court of Justice in Luxembourg in 1972. One year later, this panoramic work was unveiled at an opening ceremony in the Hotel de Ville, attended by the President of Luxembourg, Robert Lecourt, as well as the Duke and Duchess of Luxembourg.

On 4 December 1999 André Hambourg died in Paris after a long and prosperous career. Today his works can be found in the collections of museums such as the Musée National d'Art Moderne, the Musée national de la Marine, and the Musée des Arts d'Afrique et d'Océanie.

=== Personal life ===
Hambourg married Nicole Rachet, the granddaughter of Eugène Boudin’s doctor and friend, in 1948.

== Artist and illustrator ==
Hambourg wrote and illustrated two books relating what he had seen and experienced as a military correspondent. Berchtesgaden-Party and From Algiers to Berchtesgaden were published in 1947. The artist was also a prolific illustrator of collectors’ books for nearly 40 years. His illustrations are found in the following titles:

- Georges Duhamel's La Pierre d'Horeb 1953)
- Kipling's The Return of Imray (1956)
- Léo Larguier's St-Germain-des-Prés (1958)
- Henri de Régnier's Venetian Life (1959)
- Sully Prudhomme's Private Diary (1960)
- Honfleur Lights by Lucie Delarue-Madrus (1964)
- Joseph Kessel's Land of Love and Fire (1967)
- Henry de Montherlant's Gypsum Flower (1967)
- A Way of Looking at the Gardens of Versailles based on a text by Louis XIV (1974)
- André Hambourg, Peintre de la Marine, Musée de la Marine (1977)
- Robert Pariente's Venice Notebook (1979)
- Posthumous Works by Albert Camus (1979)
- Robert Pariente's Paris in Full (1985)
- Provence by André Suarès (1993)

== Awards ==
Hambourg would receive many honors and awards over his lifetime. The Cross of the Chevalier of the Legion of Honor, was given to him by the President of the French Republic in 1951. In 1986 he was made Commandeur des Arts et Lettres, as well as Commandeur of the Legion of Honor. Finally, in 1996 he became Grand Officier de l’Ordre National du Merite

== Public collections ==
- Musée National d'Art Moderne, Paris
- Eugène Boudin Museum, Honfleur
- Musée national de la Marine, Paris
- Musée des Arts d'Afrique et d'Océanie, Paris

== Bibliography ==
1. Bouret, Jean: ‘André Hambourg et la Réhabilitation sentimentale’ in coll. Artistes de ce Temps, Presses littéraires de France, Paris, 1952.
2. Flament, André/Cogniat, Raymond: ‘André Hambourg’ in coll. Maîtres de tous les Temps, Publications filmées d'Art et d'Histoire, Paris, 1970.
3. Droit, Michel: ‘André Hambourg’ in coll. Peintres et Sculpteurs d'hier et d'aujourd'hui, Éd. Pierre Cailler, Geneva, 1970.
4. Rouanet, Pierre: André Hambourg à Saint-Rémy, Terre d'Europe, Brussels, 1986.
5. Ipas, Michel: André Hambourg à Trouville-Deauville, Éd. Apestéguy, Deauville, 1990.
6. Parienté, Robert: André Hambourg, La Bibliothèque des Arts, Paris, 1991.
7. Monod, Luc: Manuel de l'amateur de livres illustrés modernes 1875-1975, Ides et Calendes, Neuchâtel, 1992.
8. Harambourg, Lydia: L'École de Paris 1945-1965. Dictionnaire des Peintres, Ides et Calendes, Neuchâtel, 1993.
9. Ipas, Michel: André Hambourg, lumières de Provence, Éd. Équinoxe, Paris, 1994.
10. Harambourg, Lydia/Hambourg, André: La Kermesse aux étoiles, Ides et Calendes, Neuchâtel, 1996.
11. André Hambourg: la vie au grand air, exhibition catalogue, Musée Olympique, Lausanne, 2001.
12. Mourot, Marjolaine/Vidal-Bué, Marion/Cazenave, Elisabeth, et al.: Lumineuse Algérie, sous le regard des peintres de marines (1830-1960), exhibition catalogue, musée national de la Marine, Toulon, 2003.
