= Jacques Zwobada =

French sculptor

- Born: 6 August 1900; Neuilly-sur-Seine, France
- Died: 6 September 1967 (aged 67); Paris, France
- Resting place: Mentana, Italy
- Education: École des Beaux-Arts
- Occupations: Sculptor, designer
- Spouse: Antonia Fiermonte (m. 1948; died 1956)

Jacques Zwobada, also spelt in other ways, such as Swobada and Zwoboda (6 August 1900 – 6 September 1967), was a French sculptor and designer.

== Life ==
Zwobada was born in a Czech family at Neuilly-sur-Seine on 6 August 1900. As a young man he had a talent for drawing and was a student at the École des Beaux-Arts from 1918 to 1924. There, he was strongly influenced by the sculpture of Auguste Rodin (1840–1917). In 1925, Zwobada won the gold medal of the International Exposition of Modern Industrial and Decorative Arts (Exposition des Arts Décoratifs et Industriels Modernes). In 1926 he was commissioned to create a monument to the musician André Caplet, then in 1928 won the deuxième second grand prix of the Prix de Rome in the sculpture category. In 1929, with René Letourneur, he won an international competition for a gigantic monument to Simón Bolívar in Quito, Ecuador. The two men then took four years to complete this in workshops at Fontenay-aux-Roses.

In 1934, Zwobada was appointed to teach at the École des Arts Appliqués in Paris, a position he held until 1962. In 1944, he also taught a course at the École Normale Supérieure de l'Enseignement Technique.

In 1948, Zwobada married Antonia Fiermonte, recently divorced from his colleague René Letourneur. His passionate love for Antonia resulted in a body of work which glorified her figure. The same year, Zwobada flew out to Venezuela for two years, having been seconded by the Ministry of Foreign Affairs to teach at the École des Beaux-Arts of Caracas and as an artistic advisor to the government of Venezuela. In 1948 he received the Grand Prix for sculpture in the annual exhibition at Caracas.

On 3 April 1956 his wife died at age 42 and Zwobada raised a monument to her in the cemetery at Mentana, near Rome, designed by his friend the architect Paul Herbé.

In 1962, he retired from teaching and was appointed professeur correcteur at the École des Beaux Arts. The same year the French Minister of Culture appointed him a Chevalier of the Order of Arts and Letters. The following year, he was appointed to the Legion of Honour.

On 6 September 1967, Zwobada died in Paris and was buried with the remains of his wife at Mentana.

== Work ==
Amongst his works are the monument to Bolívar in Quito, a mosaic on the SS France, and charcoal drawings in the Aubusson tapestry workshops. He also illustrated the work of Baudelaire in a series of twenty-five lithographs for Les fleurs du mal, as well as ten drawings for Stéphane Mallarmé's poem L'après-midi d'un faune.
