= Adolphe Beaufrère =

French painter, illustrator, and engraver

Adolphe Beaufrère (March 24, 1876 in Quimper – February 16, 1960 in Larmor-Plage) was a French painter, illustrator, and engraver.

Beaufrère joined the École nationale supérieure des Beaux-Arts in Paris in 1897 where he studied under Gustave Moreau and Fernand Cormon. Besides painting, he also worked in printmaking. His first exhibition was in 1898 at the Salon. In 1911, a scholarship enabled him to travel to Algeria, Italy and Spain. During the First World War, he served in the infantry. In 1922, he decided to settle permanently in Larmor-Plage. He primarily used etching and drypoint, with some attempts at woodcut.

In 1949, he illustrated Forest Voisine Mauritius Genevoix (Contemporary Books, 1949). He also contributed to the Ernest de Ganay (Society of St. Eloy, 1957) series of books Castles of Ile-de-France, and Old Abbeys of Ile-de-France Louis Reau (Society of St. Eloy, 1955) with fellow illustrator Henry Cheffer.

== Biography ==
In 1897, Adolphe Beaufrère enrolled at the École des Beaux-Arts in Paris, where he studied under Gustave Moreau and then Fernand Cormon. In addition to painting, he was particularly interested in engraving. He made his debut at the Salon des Artistes Français in 1898.

In 1911, a scholarship enabled him to travel to Algeria—where he stayed at the Villa Abd-el-Tif—Italy, and Spain. During World War I, he was assigned to the infantry. He settled permanently in Larmor-Plage in 1922. Beaufrère mainly used etching and drypoint, while also producing a few Wood engraving.

In 1949, he illustrated Forêt Voisine by Maurice Genevoix.

He contributed to the book Almanach, cahier de vers Émile Verhaeren(Société de Saint-Éloy, 1951). He also contributed to Ernest de Ganay's series of books Châteaux d'Île-de-France (Société de Saint-Éloy, 1957) and Louis Réau Vieilles Abbayes d'Île-de-France (Société de Saint-Éloy, 1955).

== Bibliography ==
- Elizabeth Cazenave: "Les Artistes de l'Algérie", Bernard Giovanangeli Publisher, 2001, ISBN 978-2-909034-27-0
- Elizabeth Cazenave, "La Villa Abd E TIF, Un half century of life artistique en Algérie 1907-1962", Abd El TIF Association, 1998, ISBN 978-2-9509861-1-5
- Jean-magnifiers April, Bretton Mille, biographique dictionary, Saint-Jacques-de-la-Lande, 2002, (ISBN 978-2-914612-10-4)
- Gerald Schurr et Pierre Cabana: "Dictionnaire des Petits Maitres de la Painting 1820-1920", 2003, Les Editions de l'Amateur, ISBN 978-2-85917-378-4.
- Peintres des Cotes de Bretagne, tome 5, Leo Kerlo et Jacqueline Duroc, Editions CHASSE-marée, Douarnenez 2007, ISBN 978-2-914208-86-4
- Daniel Morane, Beaufrère, catalog raisonné de l'œuvre engraved, Concarneau 1981
