= Castillon-du-Gard =

Commune in Occitanie, France

- Commune
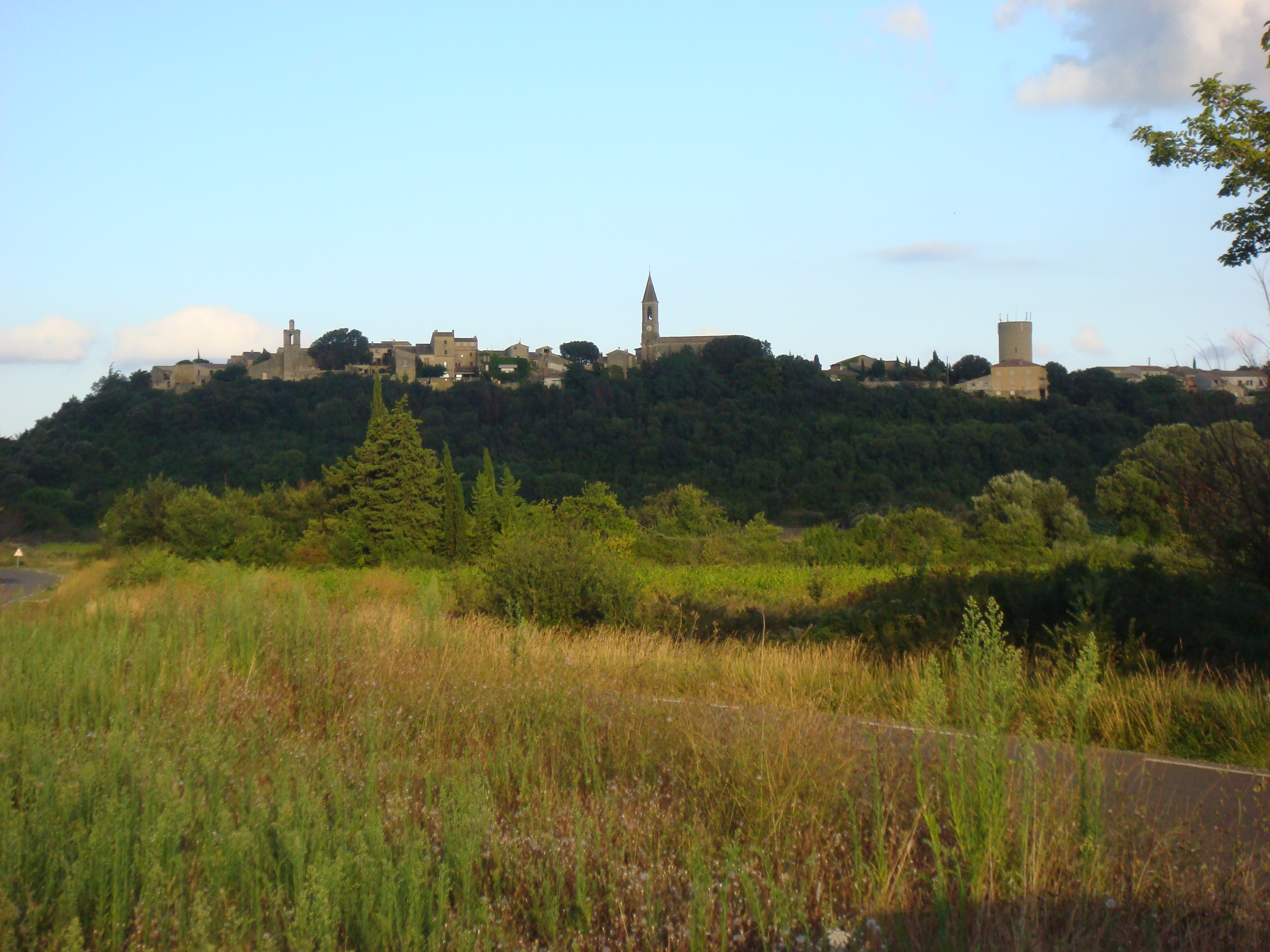
- A general view of Castillon-du-Gard

- Coat of arms
- Location of Castillon-du-Gard
- Location within France Location within Occitanie
- Coordinates: 43°58′15″N 4°33′19″E
- Country: France
- Region: Occitania
- Department: Gard
- Arrondissement: Nîmes
- Canton: Redessan
- Intercommunality: Pont du Gard

Government
  - Mayor (2020–2026): Muriel Dherbecourt
- Area^{1}: 17.38 km^{2} (6.71 sq mi)
- Elevation: 98 m (322 ft)
- Highest elevation: 194 m (636 ft)
- Lowest elevation: 17 m (56 ft)
- Population (2023): 1,695
  - Density: 97.53/km^{2} (252.6/sq mi)
- Time zone: UTC+01:00 (CET)
  - Summer (DST): UTC+02:00 (CEST)
- INSEE/Postal code: 30073 /30210
- ^{1} French Land Register data, which excludes lakes, ponds, glaciers > 1 km^{2} (0.386 sq mi or 247 acres) and river estuaries.

Castillon-du-Gard (French pronunciation: [kastijɔ̃ dy ɡaʁ]; Occitan: Castilhon de Gard) is a commune in the Gard department in southern France.

== Population ==
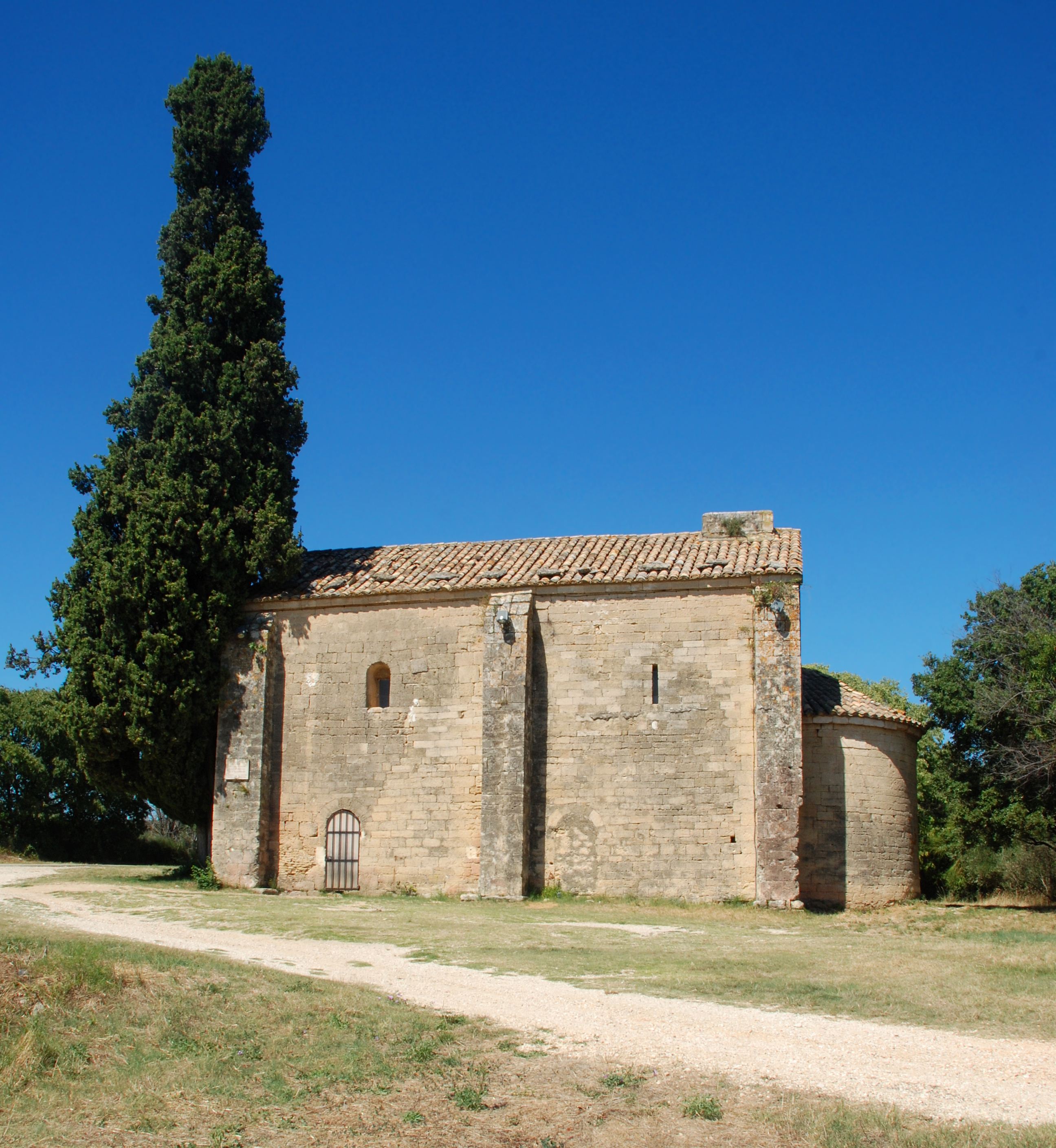

Historical population
Year	Pop.	±% p.a.
1968	468	—
1975	589	+3.34%
1982	716	+2.83%
1990	759	+0.73%
1999	943	+2.44%
2007	1,248	+3.56%
2012	1,513	+3.93%
2017	1,684	+2.16%
2023	1,695	+0.11%
Source: INSEE

== Notable people ==
- Niels Kaj Jerne (1911–1994), Danish immunologist and Nobel Prize winner, died in Castillon-du-Gard

== See also ==
- Communes of the Gard department
