= École nationale supérieure des arts appliqués et des métiers d'art =

Decorative arts school located in Paris, France

Coordinates: 48.8335°N 2.2955°E

The École nationale supérieure des arts appliqués et des métiers d'art, also called the École des Arts Appliqués or Olivier de Serres (ENSAAMA) is a post-baccalauréat teaching establishment for the decorative arts in the 15th arrondissement of Paris, France.

== History ==
ENSAAMA's ancestry can be traced back to the École des Arts Appliqués à l’Industrie, which in 1856 was the first professional women's school. This became merged with the schools of Germain Pilon and Bernard Palissy in 1925 and with the Cours Supérieur d'Esthétique Industrielle founded in 1958 by Jacques Viénot, occupying the site of the now École supérieure des arts appliqués Duperré, and of the École Nationale Supérieure des Métiers d’Art founded at the start of the 1950s, which occupied the site of the old Hôtel Salé, now the Musée Picasso.

The life of the school is organised around various disciplines (sculpture, wall decoration, ceramics, textile printing, interior architecture, visual communication, industrial aesthetics) in which recognized experts come to share their expertise: Serge Mouille directed the jewellery-making department in the 1950s, and in 1958 Roger Tallon, Georges Patrix, Denis Huisman, Jacques Fillacier, the sculpteur Stahly, the architect Paul, among others, brought the school to life with the first Industrial Aesthetics course in France. Since the start of the 20th century, the school has taken the nickname "Arts-A" (pronounced in French: Zarza).

In 1956, ENSAAMA opened the first industrial design course in France (the section then being called Industrial Aesthetics). The section still exists today, as Product Design.

In 1969, ENSAAMA moved to new premises on the Rue Olivier de Serres, in the 15th arrondissement of Paris. Over time the school has become known by the name "Olivier de Serres".

In the 1980s, the originality of this school lead to the teaching of a course for secondary-school students. This course provided an education in all the "technical" arts of the school, as well as providing a general education so that students could obtain a Baccalauréat and so the BTS (Brevet de Technicien Supérieur). This option has since been removed.

In many of the higher workshops the school teaches the BTS (Brevet de Technicien Supérieur), which is a two-year course towards, most often, a Baccalauréat in Decorative Arts, or a one-year course to get Foundation in Decorative Arts (French: mise à niveau en Arts Appliqués, MANAA).

In 2006 the school celebrated the golden jubilee of its Design section with an evening to which were invited all the alumni since its creation.

== Current situation ==
The ENSAAMA today is a public school with 710 students in post-baccalauréat education, with a diverse professional character. It is currently one of the four major Parisian establishments in the teaching of art methods (together with the École Boulle, the École supérieure des arts appliqués Duperré and the École Estienne). These schools have a solid reputation in the world of Decorative Arts and Art Methods, springing from their 150-year history.

== Diplomas ==
- DMA Sculpture: metal.
- DMA Sculpture: synthetic materials.
- DMA Working with transparent plastic
- DMA Wall decoration
- BTS Ceramic art
- BTS Textile and printing art
- BTS Visual communication option graphics, publishing, publicity
- BTS Visual communication option multimedia
- BTS Vusual expression option communication space
- BTS Space design
- BTS Product design
- DSAA Conception-creation (communication), (product) and (interior architecture – environment)

== Notable alumni and teachers ==
- Anne Asensio (b. July 13, 1962, Versailles, DSAA 1985 Industrial design Teacher 1991-1997)
- Jean-Yves Blondeau (b. 1970)
- Alain Bonnefoit (b. 1937) (teacher, 1953–55)
- Catherine Bouroche (b. 1942)
- Ronan Bouroullec (b. 1971) (teacher, 1989)
- Daniel Buren (b. 1938)
- Jean-Christophe Chauzy (b. 1963) (teacher as of 2010
- Étienne Martin (1913–1995) (teacher, 1955)
- Malika Favre (b. 1982, French illustrator)
- Georges Gimel (1898–1962)
- Jean Giraud alias Moebius (b. 1938) (teacher, 1954–1956)
- Michel Gondry (b. 1964) (teacher, 1978)
- Paul Grimault (1905–1994)
- Henri Hamm (1871-1861)
- Pierre Joubert (1910-2002), scouting leader
- Frank Margerin (b. 1968)
- Jean-Claude Mézières (b. 1938) (teacher, 1954–1958)
- Joseph-André Motte (graduated in 1948)
- Serge Mouille (1922–1988) (studied in 1937, teacher from 1953)
- Theodoros Papagiannis (born 1942), graduate student, Greek sculptor and professor
- Raymond Peynet (1908–1999) (1923)
- Georges Pichard (1920–2003) (studied in the 1930s, teacher at the École supérieure des arts appliqués Duperré)
- Éric Ruf (b. 1969)
- Jean Pierre Serrier (1934-1989; graduated in 1955)
- Tony Soulié (b. 1955)
- Yvaral
- Jacques Zwobada (1900–1967) (teacher, 1934–1962)
- Fabien Vienne
- Frédéric Zaavy (1964-2011), jeweler

== See also ==
- Industrial design
