= Villa Abd-el-Tif =

Moorish building in Algiers, Algeria

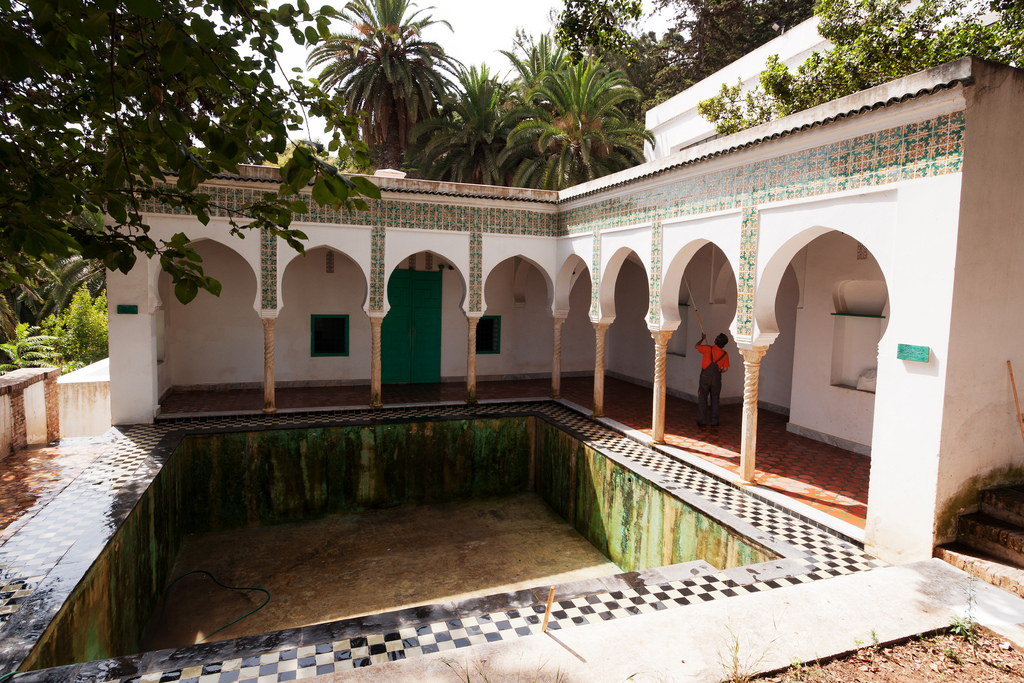
Villa Abd-el-Tif

The Villa Abd-el-Tif, also known as la Villa Medicis algérienne, is a Moorish villa located in Algiers, Algeria. It is notable for having been set up in 1907 in emulation of the French Academy in Rome, the Villa Medici. It was, until 1962, home to the laureates of the Abd-el-Tif prize who were offered bursaries to continue their studies for two years in Algeria. Abandoned after the independence of the country, it was classified as a historical monument in 1967 and restored before reopening in 2008. It now houses the headquarters of the Agence algérienne pour le rayonnement culturel (AARC).

Unlike the Villa Médici in Rome there was no permanent French director; the artists had to organize the villa's activities in Algeria as part of the bursary conditions. The villa was not a venue for the teaching of local artists, this was provided already in the École supérieure des beaux-arts d'Alger established 1843.

The same model of a bursary was later imitated again with the Prix d'Indochine for painters 1920–1939, although no equivalent villa was established in Asia, artists relied on accommodation connected with the École des Beaux-Arts de l'Indochine in Hanoi. Finally the model was applied a fourth time for a bursary for painters and composers in residence at the Casa de Velázquez in Madrid, 1929–present.
