= Simone Prouvé =

French textile artist (1931–2024)

- Born: 29 September 1931; Nancy, France
- Died: 20 September 2024 (aged 92); Nogent-sur-Marne, France
- Occupation: Textile artist
- Father: Jean Prouvé
- Relatives: Claude Prouvé (brother)
- Website: https://simoneprouve.fr/

Simone Prouvé (29 September 1931 – 20 September 2024) was a French textile artist, best known for her abstract weaved works for architecture or furniture with traditional materials and innovative materials such as stainless steel wire or fiberglass. Her works are exhibited at the Centre Pompidou.

== Early life and education ==
Simone Prouvé was born in Nancy into a family of artists. Her father, Jean Prouvé, was a self-taught engineer, architect and designer. Her grandfather was the painter and sculptor Victor Prouvé, who was, with Émile Gallé, one of the initiators of the movement of the École de Nancy, part of Art Nouveau in France.

In 1948, at the initiative of her parents, she left Nancy to take an internship and learn to weave in Paris with Micheline Pingusson, wife of Georges-Henri Pingusson, architect and friend of her father. Her father had her first weaving loom made for her.

In 1953, she went to Sweden to train with Alice Lund for six months. It was Alice Lund who put her in touch with Dora Jung in Finland, where she also trained at her studio in Helsinki.

Back in Paris, she discovered the architectural concept of Modulor created by Le Corbusier. She weaved a Modulor scarf made up of two bands, red and blue, including the graduations of the red series and the blue series. Le Corbusier included her creation in Le Modulor II published in 1955.

== Career ==
In 1954-1955, she began her collaboration with architect and designer Charlotte Perriand. Simone produced fabrics in linen, cotton and wool for Charlotte's benches. The benches were exhibited at Steph Simon's gallery in Paris. She weaved with ecru, gray, beige, olive green and black colors for the Paris Museum of Modern Art in 1961. Their collaboration lasted for many years.

From 1956, she weaved furnishing fabrics for stores in Nancy, Paris, and Brussels.

In 1958, she received a first order from the architect Dominique Louis for a large hanging tapestry which was to act as a confessional in the church of Marbache.

In 1959, she wove her first very large tapestry (H 370 x L 560 cm) at the request of architect Joseph Belmont for the Church of the Sacred Heart of Bonnecousse in Mazamet. Based on a cartoon by Philippe Hadengue, the tapestry represents the Creation, and is suspended in the choir, behind the altar. She also weaved the garment of the Virgin Mary and Child, a lead sculpture by Monique David Belmont.

Prouvé met her partner, André Schlosser, with whom she collaborated from 1963 to 1989. Schlosser drew cartoons for the tapestries, sometimes very small drawings, which Simone freely interpreted.

From the 1970s, the couple created monumental weavings, works ranging from 20 to 250 m2, or more. In 1970, Charlotte Perriand commissioned them to create a giant tapestry for the Assembly Hall at the Palais des Nations - United Nations Office at Geneva.

In the 1990s, Prouvé discovered so-called fire-resistant yarns, thermostable fibres made of metal or aramid. Her interest grew for these fibers and she spent years researching their properties, from dying to weaving: she successively tried out the properties of Clevyl, Kevlar, Kanekalon, Trevira, Kermel, Nomex, carbon, flexible stainless steel, rigid stainless steel, glass fibre, Panox Twaron®, optical fibre and copper.

Prouvé’s work attracted many architects, including Reiko Hayama, Rainer Senn, Claude Parent, Odile Decq, Emmanuelle and Laurent Beaudouin, Christian de Portzamparc, and Dominique Gonzalez-Foerster.

In 2021, the Musée National d'Art Moderne (Centre Pompidou) in Paris acquired a collection of pieces by Simone Prouvé. Presented to the public upon the museum's reopening on May 19, 2021, in a dedicated room (Room 12) on level 4, this collection consists of eight major pieces. These range from her first weavings—created in 1954 upon her return from Scandinavia—to the large panels woven from fire-retardant threads that established her reputation in the worlds of design and architecture.

In 2022, the Fonds d’art contemporain – Paris Collections acquired one piece of work by Prouvé.

In May 2023, a first monography on Simone Prouvé's career written by Muriel Seidel was published by Selena Editions.

A large sale featuring a number of her works took place in 2025.
