= Galerie Patrick Seguin =

Art gallery specializing in modern design

Coordinates: 48.8538°N 2.3754°E

Established in 1989 by Patrick and Laurence Seguin, the Galerie Patrick Seguin is an art gallery in Paris's La Bastille district. Ateliers Jean Nouvel has designed its current space.

== Activity ==
The gallery distributes the original creations of designers and architects Jean Prouvé, Charlotte Perriand, Pierre Jeanneret, Le Corbusier and Jean Royere. In this capacity, the gallery is urged by museums to contribute to exhibitions, especially:the Centre Georges Pompidou in Paris, MoMA in New York, the Vitra Design Museum in Weil am Rhein, the Museum of Decorative Arts in Paris, the Museum of Fine Arts in Nancy, the Venice Architecture Biennale, the French Embassy in Tokyo, the Château La Coste in Aix-en-Provence, the Pavillon de l'Arsenal in Paris, the MOT Museum of Contemporary Art in Tokyo and the Power Station of Art in Shanghai.

Galerie Patrick Seguin participates in international fairs: Design Miami, Paris+ by Art Basel, the International Biennale des Antiquaires in Paris, the International Contemporary Art Fair (FIAC) in Paris and The European Fine Art Fair (TEFAF) of New York.

The gallery has also developed an editorial line of monographs (Jean Prouvé, Jean Royere, Le Corbusier, Pierre Jeanneret).

Alongside a programming dedicated each year to elements like his demountable houses by Jean Prouvé, in which she now has the most extensive collection, the gallery Patrick Seguin led a political invitation close to the major international contemporary art galleries—these present in the space of Patrick Seguin Gallery in Paris monographic or thematic exhibitions. Thus, after the Jablonka Gallery in 2002, Hauser & Wirth Gallery in 2006, and Richard Prince's solo exhibition with Gagosian Gallery in 2008, is the Galerie Eva Presenhuber who invested the space of the gallery Patrick Seguin in 2009, then Sadie Coles gallery in 2010, the gallery Massimo de Carlo in 2011, Paula Cooper in 2012, Kurimanzutto in 2014, Luhring Augustine in 2015, Karma in 2016, David Kordansky Gallery in 2018 and Gavin Brown's enterprise en 2019.

== History ==
The gallery was founded in Paris in 1989. In October 2015, the Galerie Patrick Seguin opened a second space in London, in the heart of a prestigious area of Mayfair - 45-47 Brook Street. Alternating between architecture, historic design and contemporary art exhibitions, the space closed its doors in 2019.

Patrick Seguin is an expert close to the National Company of experts2 affiliated to the Syndicat National des Antiquaires and the Committee of Professional Art3 Galleries.

In recognition of his work, Patrick Seguin was named 'Chevalier de l’Ordre des Arts et des Lettres' by the French Ministry of Culture in March 2018. The decoration was awarded at the Picasso Museum by Jack Lang, former Minister of Culture, at the same time as Yusaku Maezawa's.

In October 2023, he was made an 'Officier de l'Ordre des Arts et des Lettres'.

== Bibliography (selection) ==
- Jean Prouvé Architecture set 5 volumes (5 monographs on Jean Prouve's architecture, editions Gallery Patrick Seguin, Paris 2015)
- jean Prouvé-Pierre Jeanneret Demountable House BCC (monographs about jean Prouvé, editions Gallery Patrick Seguin, Paris 2014)
- Jean Prouvé total filling station (monograph about Jean Prouvé, edition Gallery Patrick Seguin, Paris 2014)
- Jean Prouvé Demountable House 6x6 (éditions Gallery Patrick Seguin, Paris, 2013)
- Jean Prouvé Demountable House 8x8 (éditions Gallery Patrick Seguin, Paris, 2013)
- Le Corbusier-Pierre Jeanneret Chandigarh, India (edition Gallery Patrick Seguin, Paris 2013)
- Calder-Prouvé (edition Gagosian Gallery & Gallery Patrick Seguin, 2013)
- Calder-Prouvé serie of 10 postcards (edition Gagosian Gallery & Gallery Patrick Seguin, 2013)
- A passion for Jean Prouvé (edition Pinacoteca Giovanni e Marella Agnelli & Gallery Patrick Seguin, 2013)
- Jean Royère (monograph about Joan Riviere, editions Gallery Patrick Seguin & Gallery Jacques Lacoste, Paris 2012)
- Jean Royère (éditions Galerie Patrick Seguin & Galerie Jacques Lacoste, Paris, 2012)
- Prouvé/Nouvel-Ferembal House (édition Galerie Patrick Seguin, Paris 2011).
- Jean Prouvé (éditions Galerie Patrick Seguin, Paris - Sonnabend Gallery, New York 2007)
- Tadao Ando (edition Enrico Navarra & Gallery Patrick Seguin, 2006)
- L'urgence permanente (edition Enrico Navarra & Gallery Patrick Seguin, 2002)
- Jean Prouvé La Biennale di Venezia (edition Enrico Navarra & Gallery Jousse Seguin, 2000)
- Jean Prouvé (edition Enrico Navarra & Gallery Jousse Seguin,1998)
