= Patrick Seguin =

French art dealer and gallery owner

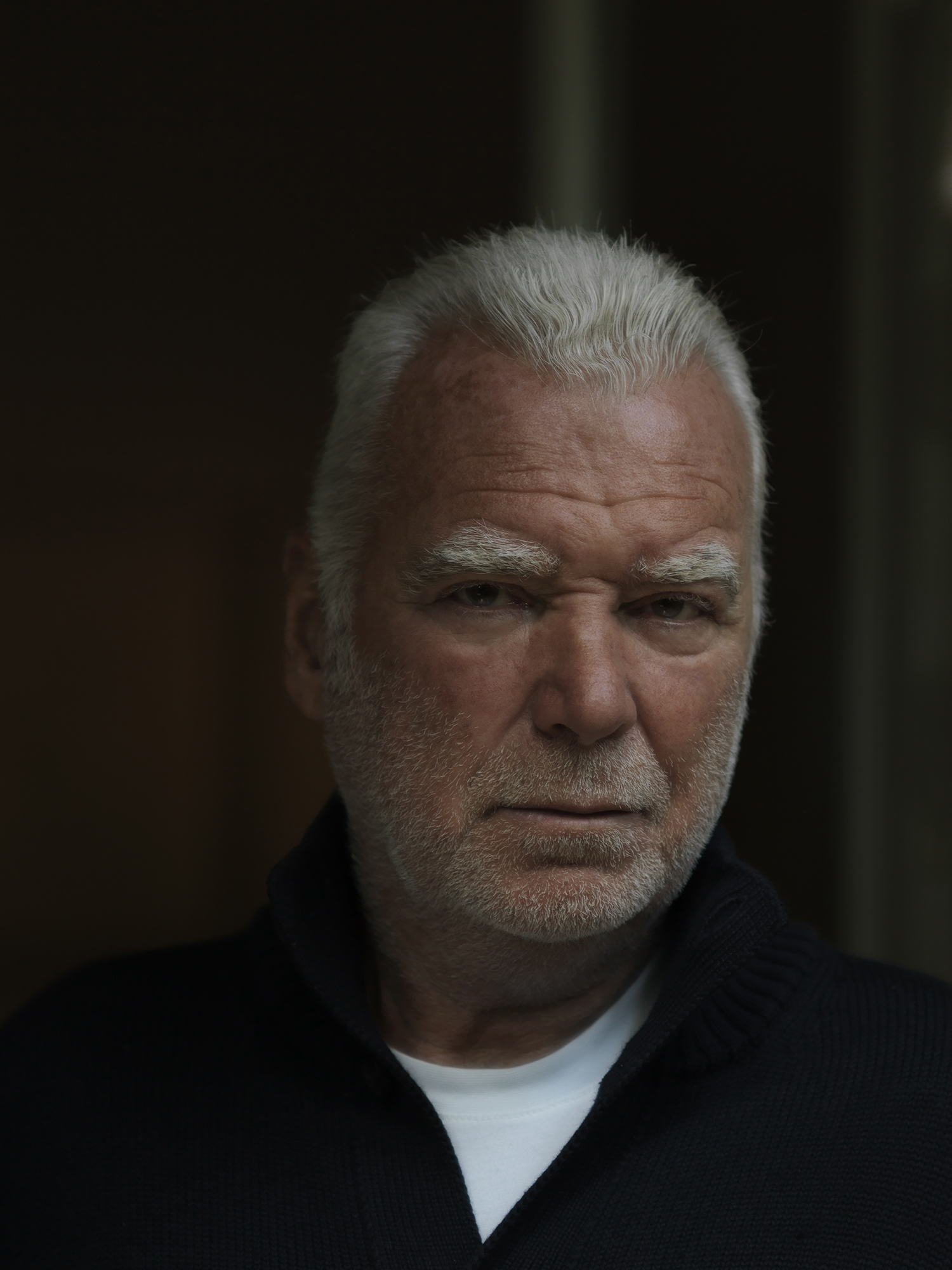
Patrick Seguin

Patrick Seguin is a French gallery owner specializing in French architect-designed furniture of the 20th century, and he is the founder of Galerie Patrick Seguin.

He is a member of the Compagnie Nationale des Experts, the Syndicat National des Antiquaires and the Comité pour la Création Contemporaine des Amis du Musée d'Art Moderne de Paris since its creation in 2015.

In recognition of his work, Patrick Seguin was named ‘Chevalier de l’Ordre des Arts et des Lettres’ by the French Ministry of Culture in March 2018.

In October 2023, he was made an 'Officier de l'Ordre des Arts et des Lettres'.

== Biography ==
Patrick Seguin, born 29 January 1954 in Montpellier, France, is the son of Colette Seguin. He is married to Laurence Bergerot, with whom he has a daughter, Pauline (born 1990). Before specialising in design in 1989, Patrick Seguin worked in the hospitality business. In 1989 he founded the Jousse Seguin gallery with Philippe Jousse on Rue de Charonne in Paris’ 11th arrondissement. Then in 2000 he opened his eponymous gallery on Rue des Taillandiers in a former warehouse, renovated by Jean Nouvel.

Patrick and Laurence Seguin’s private collection of contemporary art, design, and architecture by Jean Prouvé has been the subject of several exhibitions, including ‘A Passion for Jean Prouvé’ at the Pinacoteca Giovanni e Marella Agnelli in Turin (Italy) in 2013 and ‘Jean Prouvé, l’âme du Métal’ at the Château La Coste (Bouches du Rhône, France) in 2019.

Patrick Seguin has organised numerous international exhibitions, including ‘Furniture and Architecture by Jean Prouvé’, Sonnabend Gallery (New York 2003); ‘Charlotte Perriand – Jean Prouvé, 20th century architecture and furniture’, Gagosian Gallery (Los Angeles 2004); ‘Le Corbusier/Pierre Jeanneret, Chandigarh, India, 1952–56’, Sonnabend Gallery (New York 2006); ‘Jean Royère’, Sonnabend Gallery (New York 2008); ‘Calder I Prouvé’, Gagosian Gallery (Paris – Le Bourget 2013); ‘Jean Nouvel Triptyques’, Gagosian Gallery (London 2014); ‘Chamberlain I Prouvé’, Gagosian Gallery (New York 2015); ‘Jean Prouvé: the Constructor’, French Embassy in Tokyo (Tokyo 2016), ‘Jean Prouvé : Architect for Better Days’, Fondation Luma (Arles, France 2017–18), ‘Jean Prouvé : Constructive Imagination' at the MOT Museum of Contemporary Art, Tokyo in 2022.

Patrick Seguin has also collaborated on numerous institutional exhibitions, including with the Centre Pompidou (Paris), the Venice Biennale of Architecture (Venice 2000 and 2014), the Musée des Beaux-Arts (Nancy, France 2005 and 2012), MoMa (New York 2008), the Milan Triennale (Milan 2015), the Musée des Arts Décoratifs (Paris 2017), the Fondation Louis Vuitton (Paris 2019) and the Design Museum (London 2021). Since 2002, Patrick Seguin organises ‘carte blanche’ exhibitions during Paris’s annual FIAC art fair, inviting international contemporary art galleries to exhibit in his Paris gallery. Galleries invited include: Jablonka Galerie (2002), Hauser & Wirth (2006), Gagosian Gallery (2008), Eva Presenhuber (2009), Sadie Coles HQ (2010), Galeria Massimo de Carlo (2011), Paula Cooper (2012), Kurimanzutto (2014), Luhring Augustine (2015), Karma (2016), David Kordansky (2018), Campoli Presti (London 2018), Ivor Braka (London, 2018), and Gavin Brown’s Enterprise (2019).

=== Collaborations ===
Jean Nouvel: Patrick Seguin has worked with Jean Nouvel on contemporary adaptations of Jean Prouvé demountable houses, notably the Ferembal house and the Bouqueval schoolhouse.

Also close to numerous art and fashion personalities, Patrick Seguin has worked with Azzedine Alaïa, The Row (Ashley Olsen and Mary-Kate Olsen), Virgil Abloh, A.P.C., and Yves Saint Lauren.

=== Awards ===
Chevalier de l’Ordre des Arts et des Lettres. He was named ‘chevalier' in March 2018.

Officier de l’Ordre des Arts et des Lettres. He was named 'officier' in October 2023.

== Galerie Patrick Seguin ==
=== Presentation ===
Galerie Patrick Seguin is in the Bastille district in Paris, in a space designed by Jean Nouvel (Pritzker Prize 2008). The gallery shows works by Jean Prouvé, Charlotte Perriand, Pierre Jeanneret, Le Corbusier and Jean Royère, and owns the most complete collection of furniture and demountable architecture by Jean Prouvé (24 houses). Galerie Patrick Seguin has also developed an important publishing activity, producing books to accompany its exhibitions; works include a 2-volume monograph on Jean Prouvé (750 pages), a series of three 5-volume box-sets on Jean Prouvé’s demountable architecture, a 2-volume monograph on Jean Royère (650 pages), a book on Le Corbusier and Pierre Jeanneret’s architectural project for the town of Chandigarh and its furniture.

== Artists represented by the gallery ==
- Jean Prouvé
- Charlotte Perriand
- Pierre Jeanneret
- Jean Royère
- Le Corbusier

== Publications ==
To accompany its programme of exhibitions, Patrick Seguin has also developed an important publishing activity, producing monographs on the designers represented, but also catalogues of the major exhibitions organised by the gallery with other well-known galleries (design and contemporary art).

2019: Jean Prouvé Architecture – box set n°3 (Jean Prouvé, Maxéville Design Office, 1948; Jean Prouvé, 6x9 Demountable House, 1944; Jean Prouvé, Bouqueval School – Adaptation Jean Nouvel, 1950–2016; Jean Prouvé and Pierre Jeanneret, Demountable Pavilion, 1940; Jean Prouvé, His House in Nancy, 1954)
2017: Jean Prouvé, 2-volume box set
2016: Jean Prouvé Architecture – box set n°2 (Jean Prouvé, 6x6 Demountable House, 1944–2015 – Adaptation Rogers Stirk Harbour + Partners; Jean Prouvé, Métropole Demountable House, 1949; Jean Prouvé, Les Jours Meilleurs Demountable House, 1956; Jean Prouvé, 4x4 Military Shelter, 1939; Jean Prouvé, Villejuif Temporary School, 1957)
2014: Jean Prouvé Architecture – box set n°1 (Jean Prouvé, 6x6 Demountable House, 1944; Jean Prouvé, 8x8 Demountable House, 1944; Jean Prouvé and Pierre Jeanneret, BCC Demountable House, 1941; Jean Prouvé, Service Station, 1969; Jean Prouvé, Ferembal Demountable House – Adaptation Jean Nouvel, 1948–2010)
2014: Le Corbusier, Pierre Jeanneret – Chandigarh, India
2013: A Passion for Jean Prouvé, Edition Pinacoteca Giovanni E Marella Agnelli and Galerie Patrick Seguin
2013: Calder I Prouvé, Gagosian Gallery and Galerie Patrick Seguin (out of print)
2012: Jean Royère, Edition Jacques Lacoste and Galerie Patrick Seguin
2011: Prouvé I Nouvel, Ferembal House
2007: Jean Prouvé, Edition Galerie Patrick Seguin and Sonnabend Gallery (out of print)
2006: Tadao Ando, Edition Enrico Navarra and Galerie Patrick Seguin (out of print)
2002: The Permanent Emergency, Edition Enrico Navarra and Galerie Patrick Seguin (out of print)
2000: Jean Prouvé I La Biennale di Venezia, Edition Enrico Navarra and Galerie Jousse Seguin (out of print)
1998: Jean Prouvé, Edition Enrico Navarra and Galerie Jousse Seguin (out of print)
