= Reiko Hayama (architect) =

Japanese architect (1933–2025)

Reiko Hayama (Japanese: 早間玲子, romanized: Hayama Reiko; November 9, 1933 – January 20, 2025) was a Japanese architect. She became the first architect from Japan to work in France.

== Biography ==
Reiko Hayama was born in Tokyo in 1933. She attended Yokohama National University from 1952 to 1958.

From 1959 to 1965, she worked for Kunio Maekawa, who had collaborated with the Swiss French architect Le Corbusier.

Hayama left Japan in 1966 and moved to Paris thanks to a Franco-Japanese collaboration scholarship issued by the French government. She became the first Japanese architect authorized by the French state to work in France.

In France, she spent three years collaborating with Charlotte Perriand, then spent 1969–1976 working with Jean Prouvé. The latter encouraged her to add a French degree to her Japanese credential, which she obtained.

In 1975, Hayama was named a member of the French Order of Architects. From 1976 to 2013, she ran her own architecture studio, Hayama & Associates. She often designed factories and offices for Japanese companies operating in France.

France named her a knight of both the Ordre des Arts et des Lettres and the Legion of Honour. In 2011, she was named 4th Class, Gold Rays with Rosette, in the Japanese Order of the Rising Sun.

Hayama died in Paris in 2025 at age 91.

== Major projects ==
- 1975: Bank of Tokyo
- 1976: Maison du Japon at the Cité internationale universitaire de Paris (exterior renovation)
- 1978: Maison du Japon at the Cité internationale universitaire de Paris (interior renovation)
- 1978: Dupuis house, Chaville
- 1984 and 1994: Canon Bretagne S.A.S., Brittany
- 1990: Yamaha Music France S.A., Marne-la-Vallée
- 1990: Institut Culturel Franco-Japonais, Saint-Quentin-en-Yvelines
- 1992: Konica-Minolta Lorraine S.A.S., Vosges
- 1992: Hitachi Computer Europe S.A.S., Orléans
- 1992: Domaine de Belesbat Neuf (restoration, hotel renovation), Essone
- 1992: Ogura S.A.S., Valenciennes
- 1992: Akebono Brake S.A.S., Gonesse
- 1992: Noritsu France S.A., Évry
- 2000: Sanden Manufacturing Europe S.A.S., Brittany
- 2001: Japanese Ambassador's Residence (renovation), Paris
- 2012: Yamagata Toyopet S.A., Yamagata
