= Auguste-Michel Colle =

French painter of the Nancy school (1872–1949)

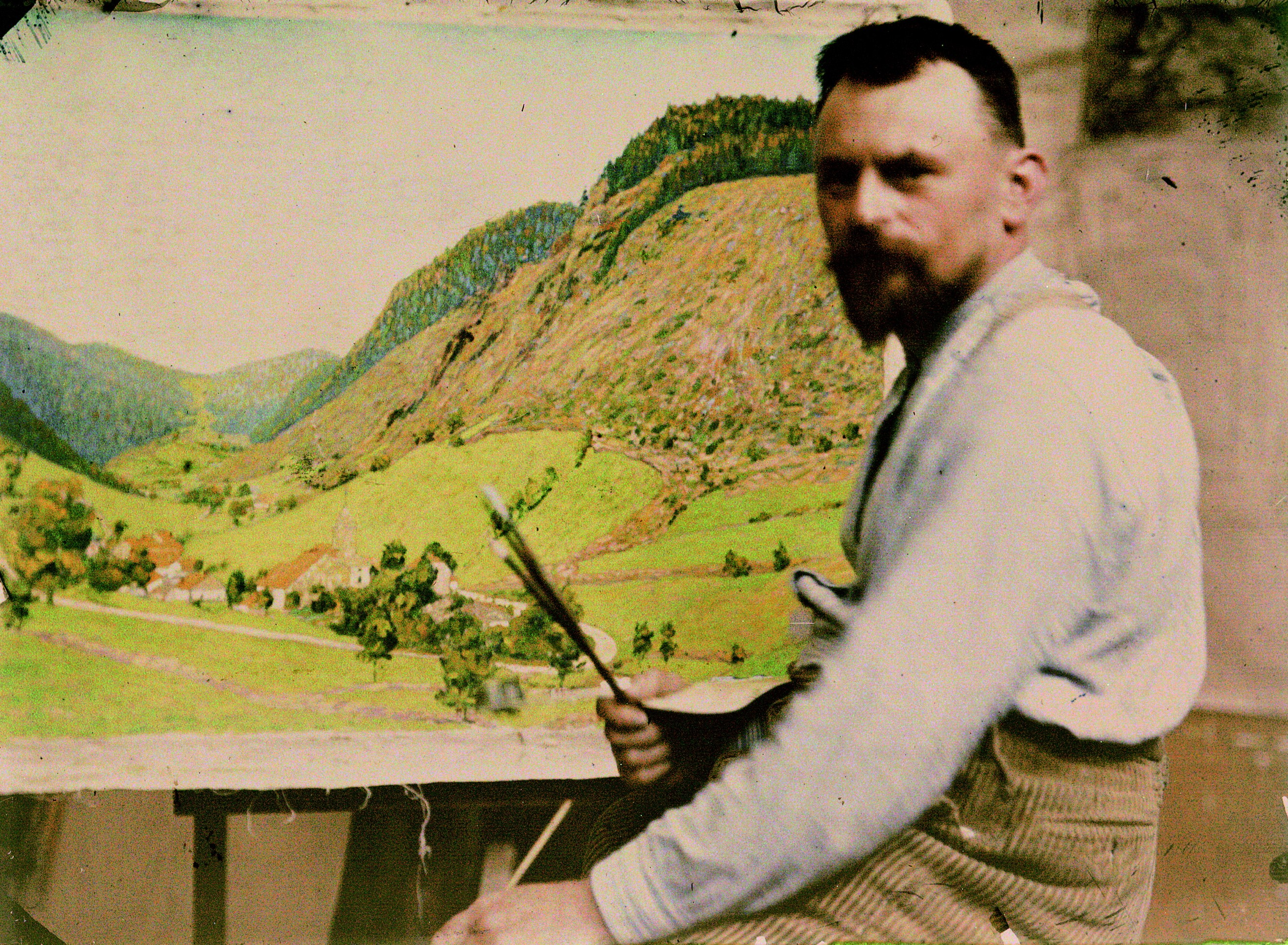
- Auguste-Michel Colle circa 1910
- Born: 7 January 1872; Baccarat, Meurthe-et-Moselle, France
- Died: 16 September 1949 (aged 77); City of Batz-sur-Mer, France
- Occupations: Artist & Painter
- Years active: c. 1895-1940
- Known for: Impressionist painter of the Nancy school

Auguste-Michel Colle (January 7, 1872 – September 16, 1949), sometimes known as Michel-Auguste Colle, and later simply Michel Colle, a French painter of the Nancy school, active from c. 1900 to c. 1940. His pictures are in a number of private and public collections in France and elsewhere, including the Centre Pompidou, Paris; the Musée d'Art Moderne de Paris; the Paris Hotel de Ville; the Musée del Guerre, Paris; the Musée des Beaux-Arts de Rennes; the Charlier Museum in Brussels; the Carnegie Museum, Pittsburgh; the Musée d'Arts de Nantes; the Musée des Beaux-Arts de Nancy; the Musée de l'École de Nancy; the Musée de l'Histoire du Fer, also in Nancy (recently renamed Féru des Sciences); the Musée Pierre-Noël de Saint-Dié-des-Vosges in Saint Dié; and the Musée des Marais Salants, in Batz-Sur-Mer.

Until 1916, the painter most often signed his works "A. M. Colle", later adopting the signature "Michel Colle", or "M. Colle".

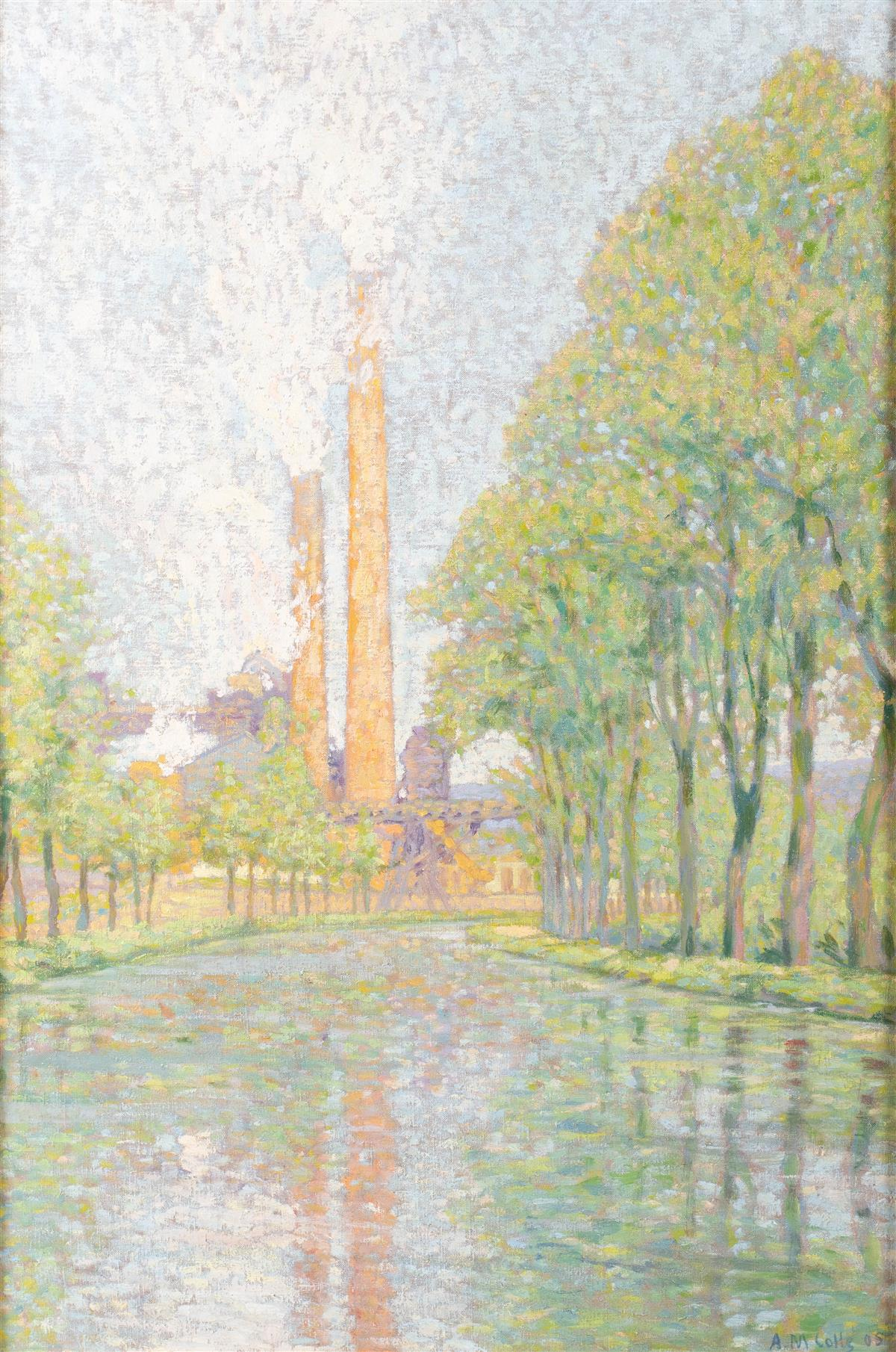
Les Hauts Fourneaux De Maxéville (The Blast Furnaces Of Maxéville), 1905

Colle was born on January 7, 1872, in Baccarat (Meurthe et Moselle), France, and died in Batz-sur-Mer, September 16, 1949. Orphaned in 1885, he apprenticed at the Baccarat crystal works as a gilder and engraver. After studying painting with Charles Peccatte, an artist from Lorraine working in Baccarat, he met Eugène Corbin, a department store owner and art collector, who introduced Colle to the painters Charles de Meixmoron de Dombasle, Émile Friant and Victor Prouvé (Prouvé was then a professor at the Ecole des Beaux-Arts in Nancy). Corbin had Colle under an exclusive contract from 1903 until 1911, and he both collected and sold the artist's works. In 1905, Colle married the sister of Victor Prouvé's wife, Marguerite Adèle Duhamel.. (Colle's relationship with Victor Prouvé was both personal and professional, and the two would go on painting excursions together, with Colle documenting one such outing in a 1911 canvas.)

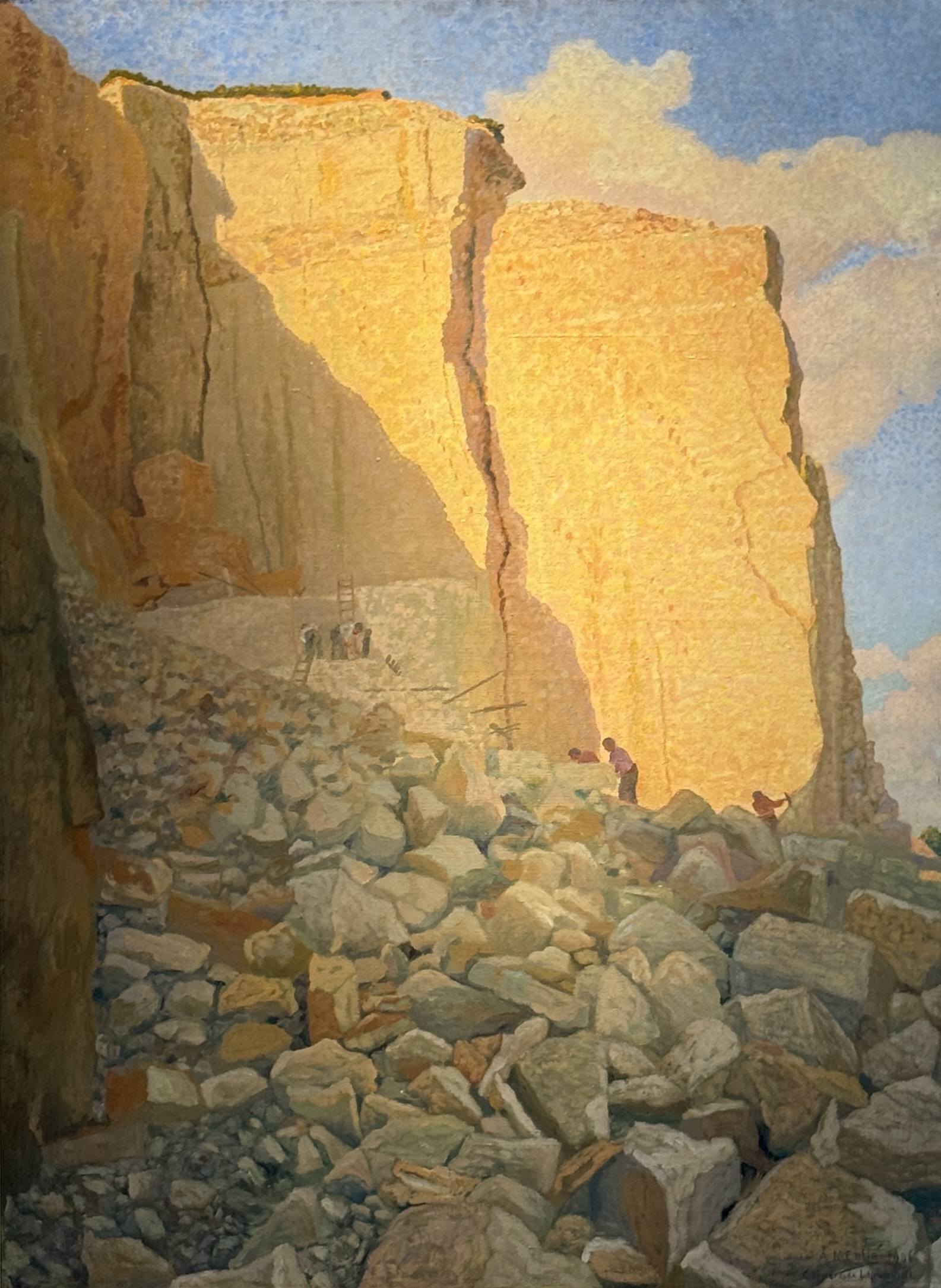
Les Mineurs à la Carrière de Lérouville, exhibited at the Nancy Salon of 1907, and later in the collection of Eugène Corbin

From 1903, Colle exhibited at various salons, including at the Paris Salon de la Société Nationale in 1903; the Decorative Art Exhibition of Nancy (organized in the Salle Poirel) in 1904, the Nancy Salon (1905, 1906 & 1907 and possibly other years), the Salon des Tuileries and the Salon des Indépendants, winning a medal at the Salon des Artistes Français in 1921. Many of Colle's works in these years, especially in the first decade of the century, included industrial landscapes (for example his picture in the Musée Lorrain from 1909), depicting the Dupont and Fould steel mills in Pompey, which had been celebrated as a source of the Eiffel Tower's iron. In 1919 and 1920, he painted cartoons for stained glass windows in Strasbourg Cathedral. He continued to exhibit at Salons in France and in the Hague through the 1930s. In 1932, he was presented with the French Legion Of Honour. In 1935, he showed two pictures at the Salon des Indépendants in Paris, one of which ("Notre-Dame d'Afrique") was painted on a trip to Algeria, above the town of Bologhine. After 1940, Colle had settled permanently in the village of Kervalet, near Batz-sur-Mer.

There was a significant sale of Colle pictures at Ader, Paris, with 18 works auctioned on February 4, 2011.

An interesting note in Colle's life can be found in an important letter he received from Claude Monet in 1906, sold at auction in 2022. Colle was clearly a fan of Monet and his work, and in the letter Monet asks him to be patient regarding arrangements to visit his studio in Giverny, and closes with an admonition to avoid using the term "impressionist":

"I have perfectly received your two letters but, being very busy, have been unable to reply sooner. The matter about which you ask me is quite serious and delicate. I surely do not want to refuse, and only pray you to tell me beforehand when you would like to come for, if I should be at work, it would impossible for me to receive you. I would therefore have to decide the day and time…P.S. You seem to singularly stick to this title of 'impressionist', which does not mean much and has made people tell so much nonsense."

== Selected works ==
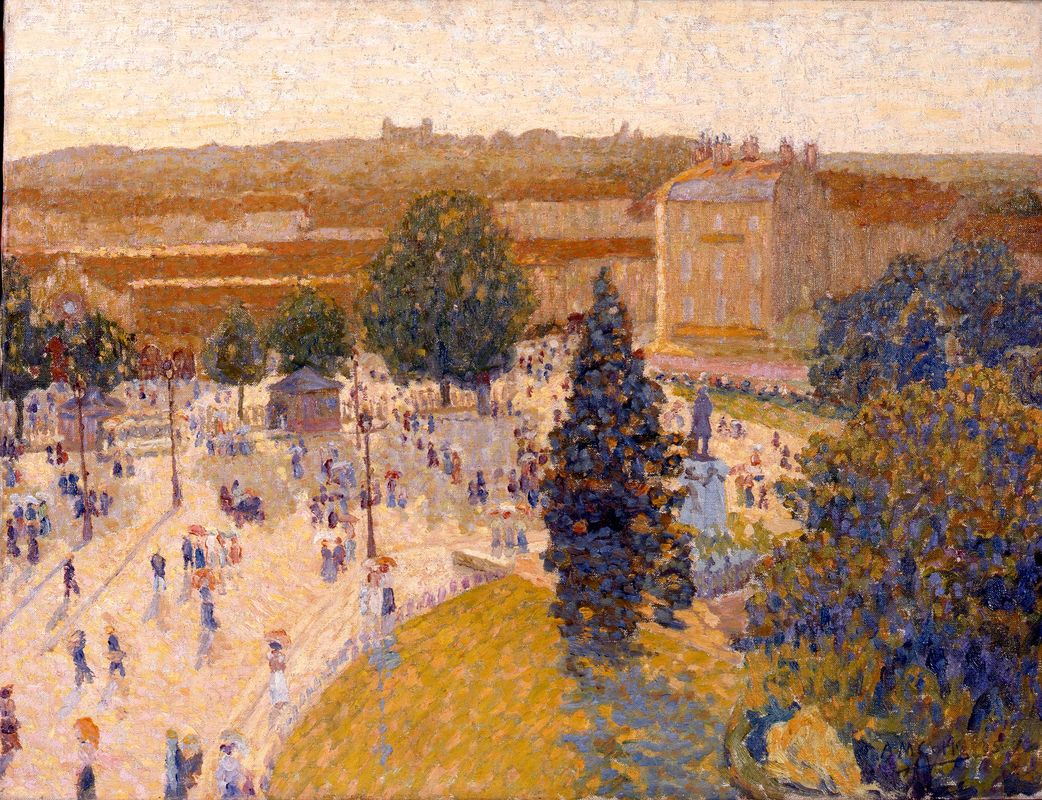
La Place Thiers à Nancy, Musée des Beaux-Arts de Nancy, c. 1900

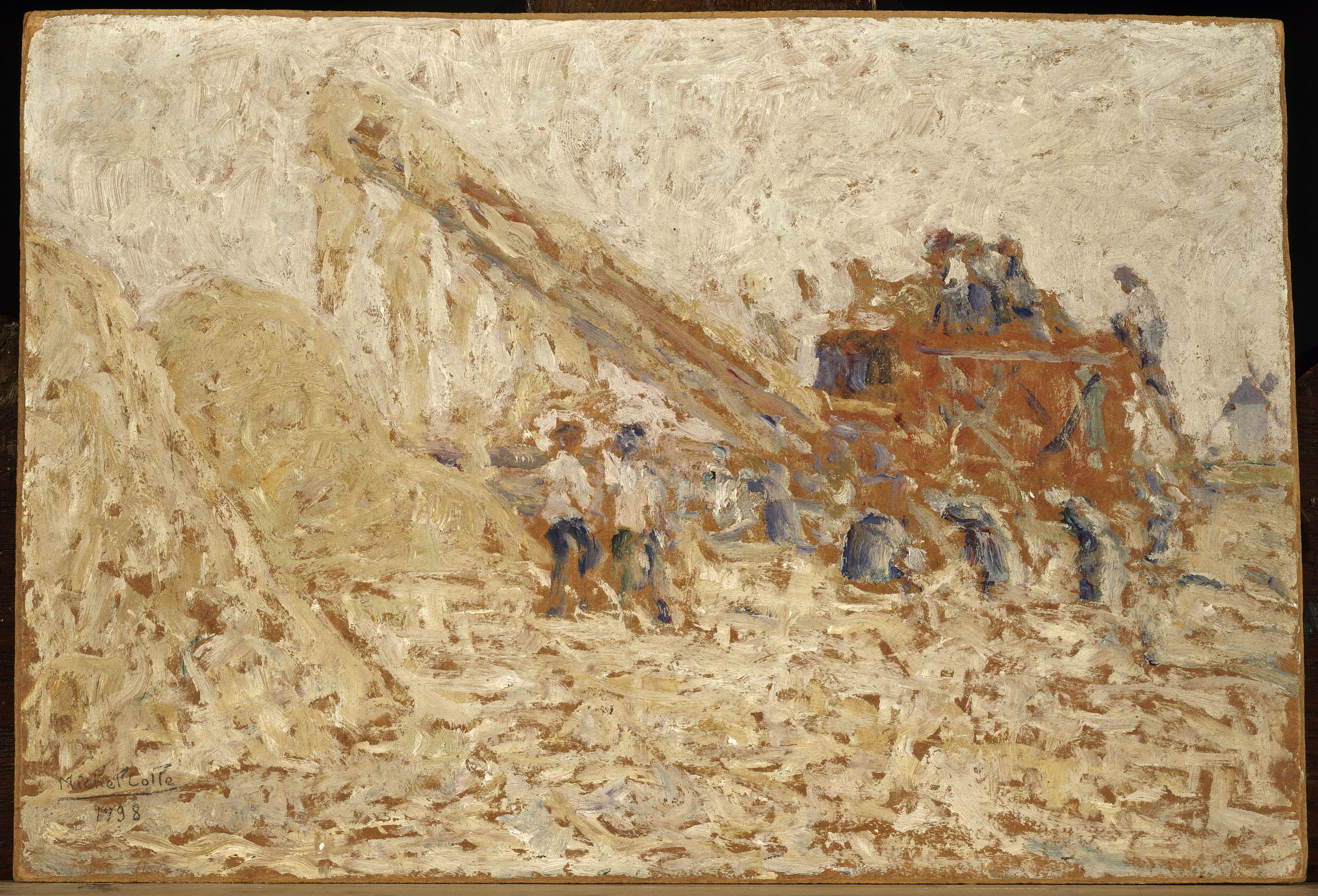
"Battage du Blé à Batz", Musée des Beaux-Arts de Rennes, 1938

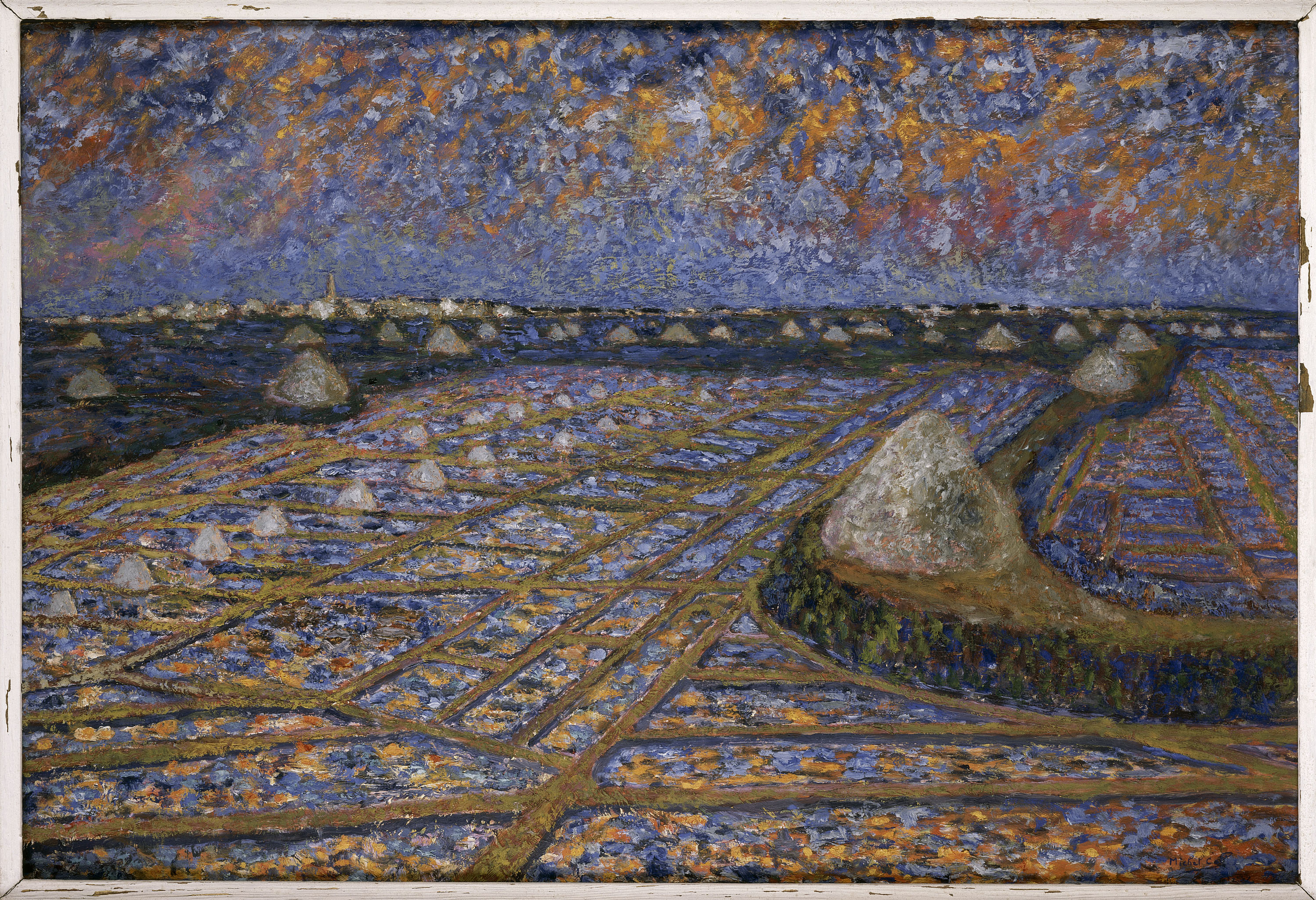
"Marais Salant au Bourg de Batz", Musée des Beaux-Arts de Rennes, 1940

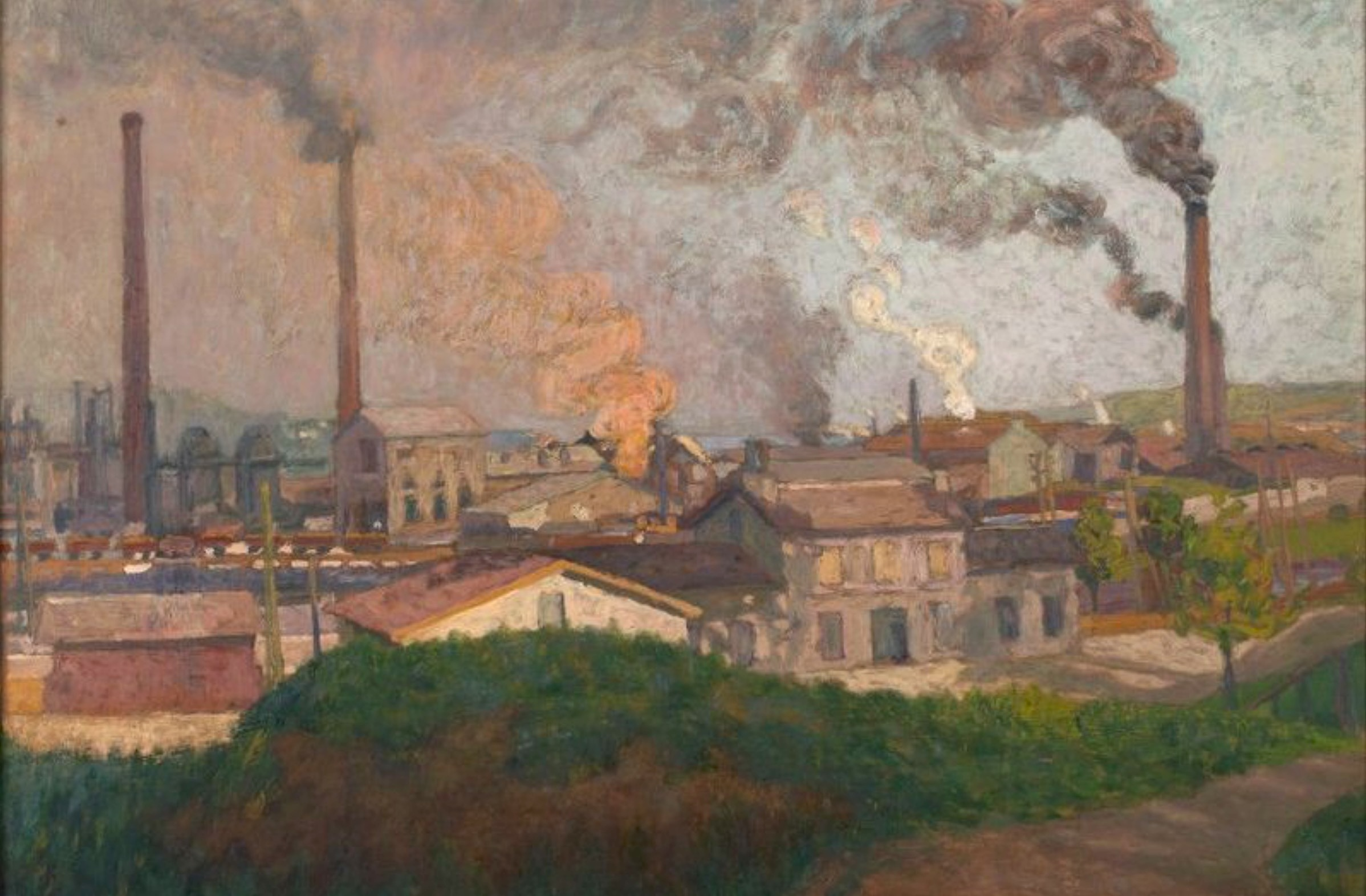
Les Aciéries de Pompey, Musée Lorrain, 1909

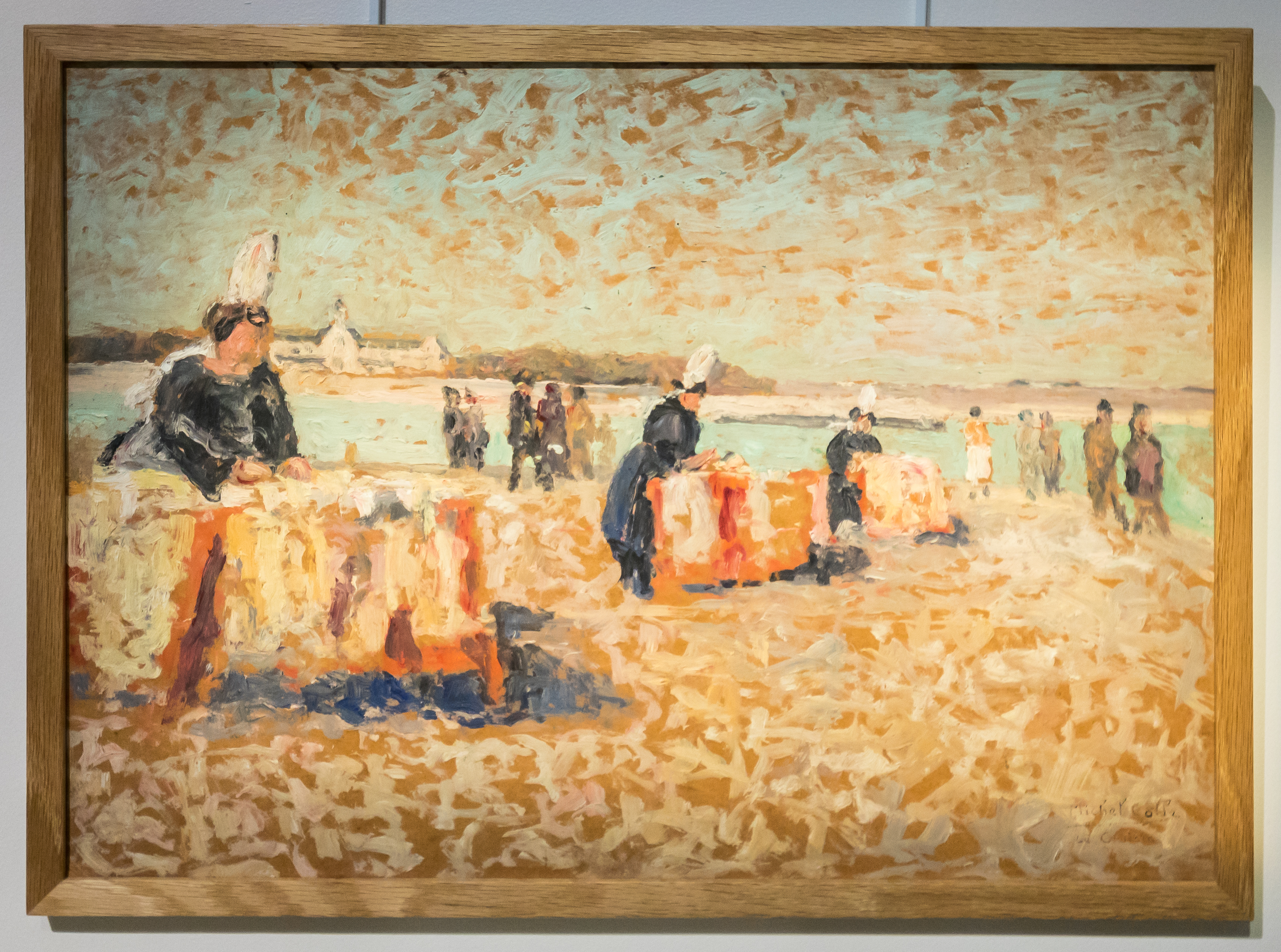
Bigoudènes dentellières Le Croisic, Musée des Marais Salants, 1921

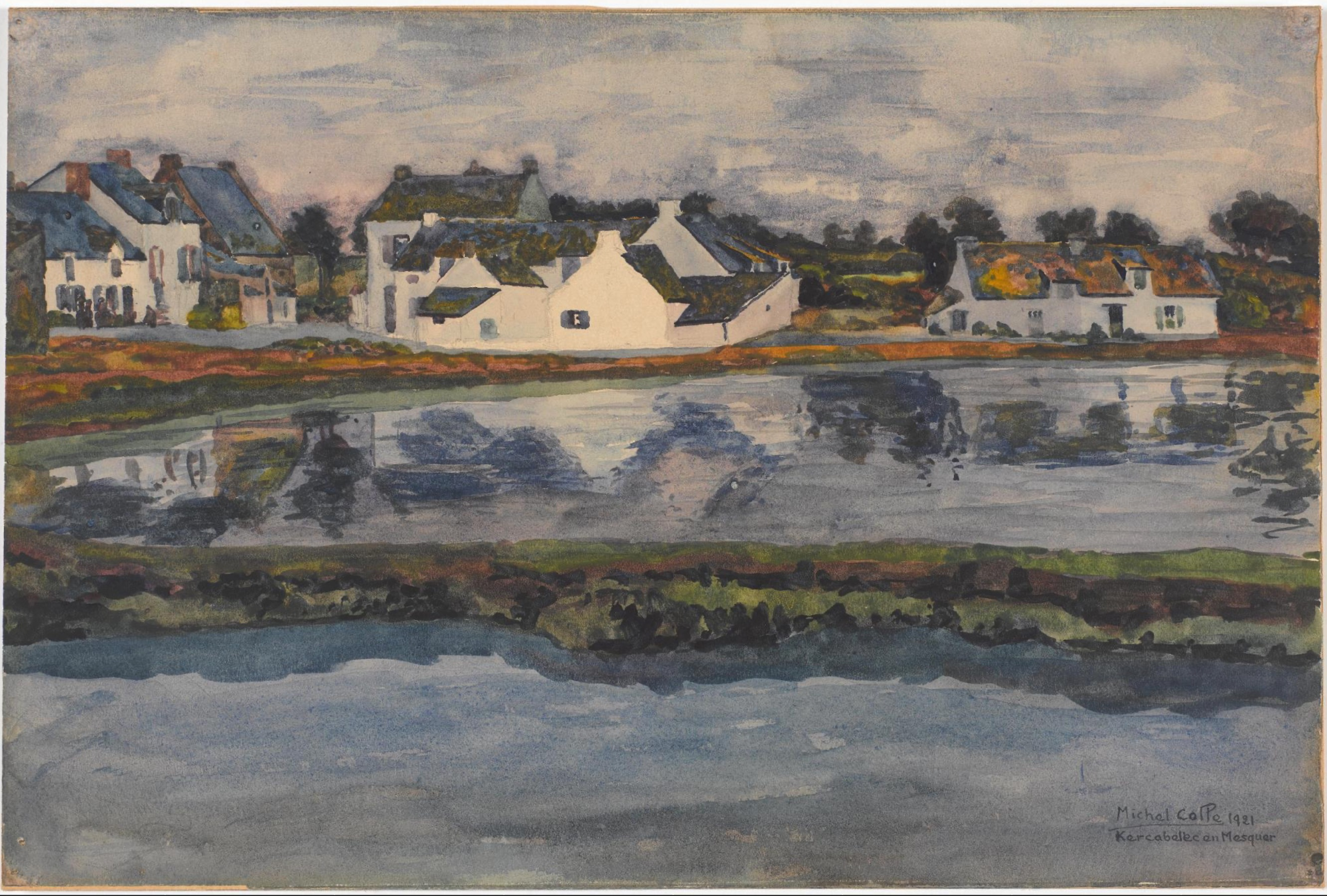
Kercabelec en Mesquier, Centre Pompidou, 1921

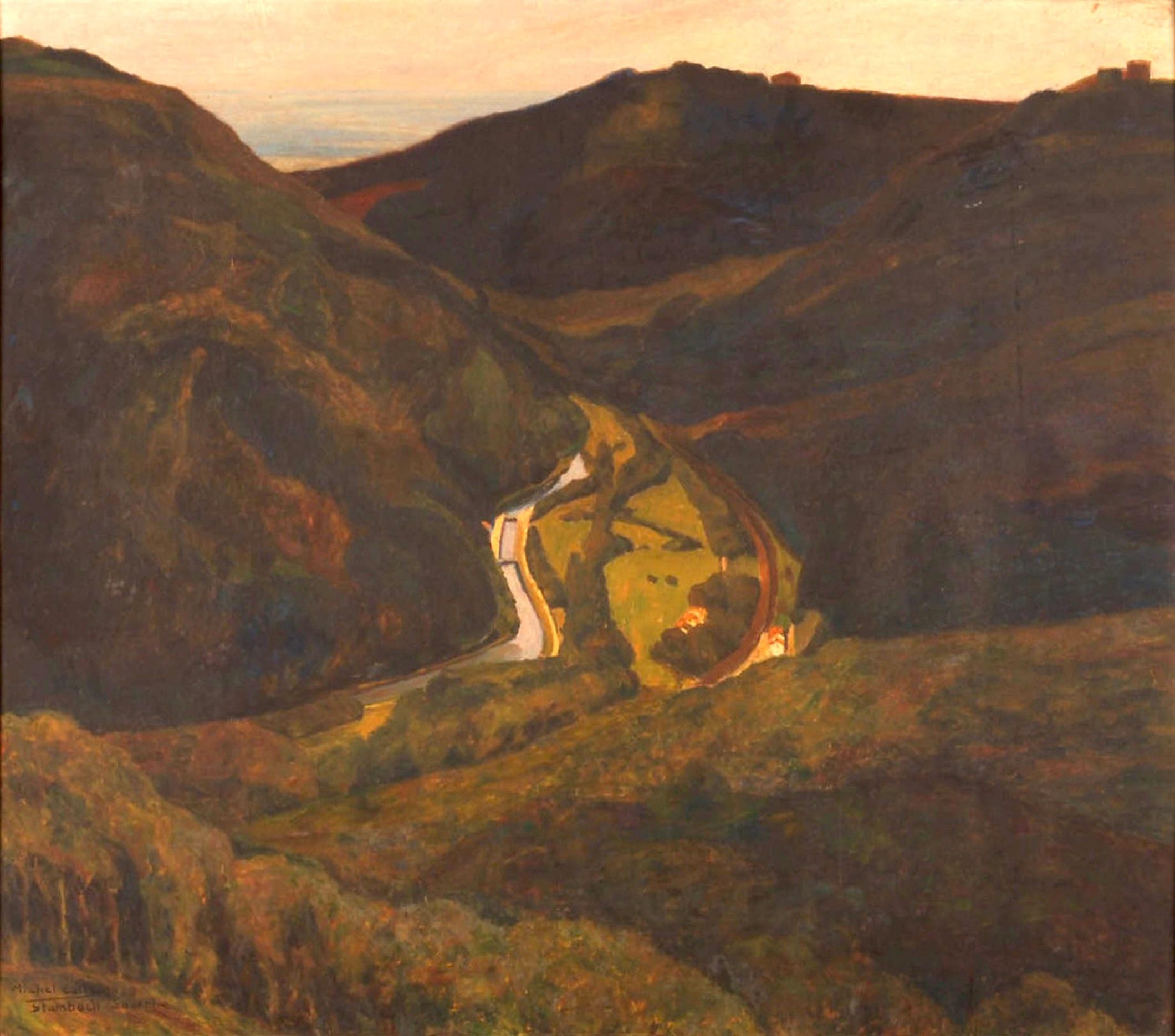
Stambach près de Saverne, Strasbourg Museum of Modern and Contemporary Art, 1920

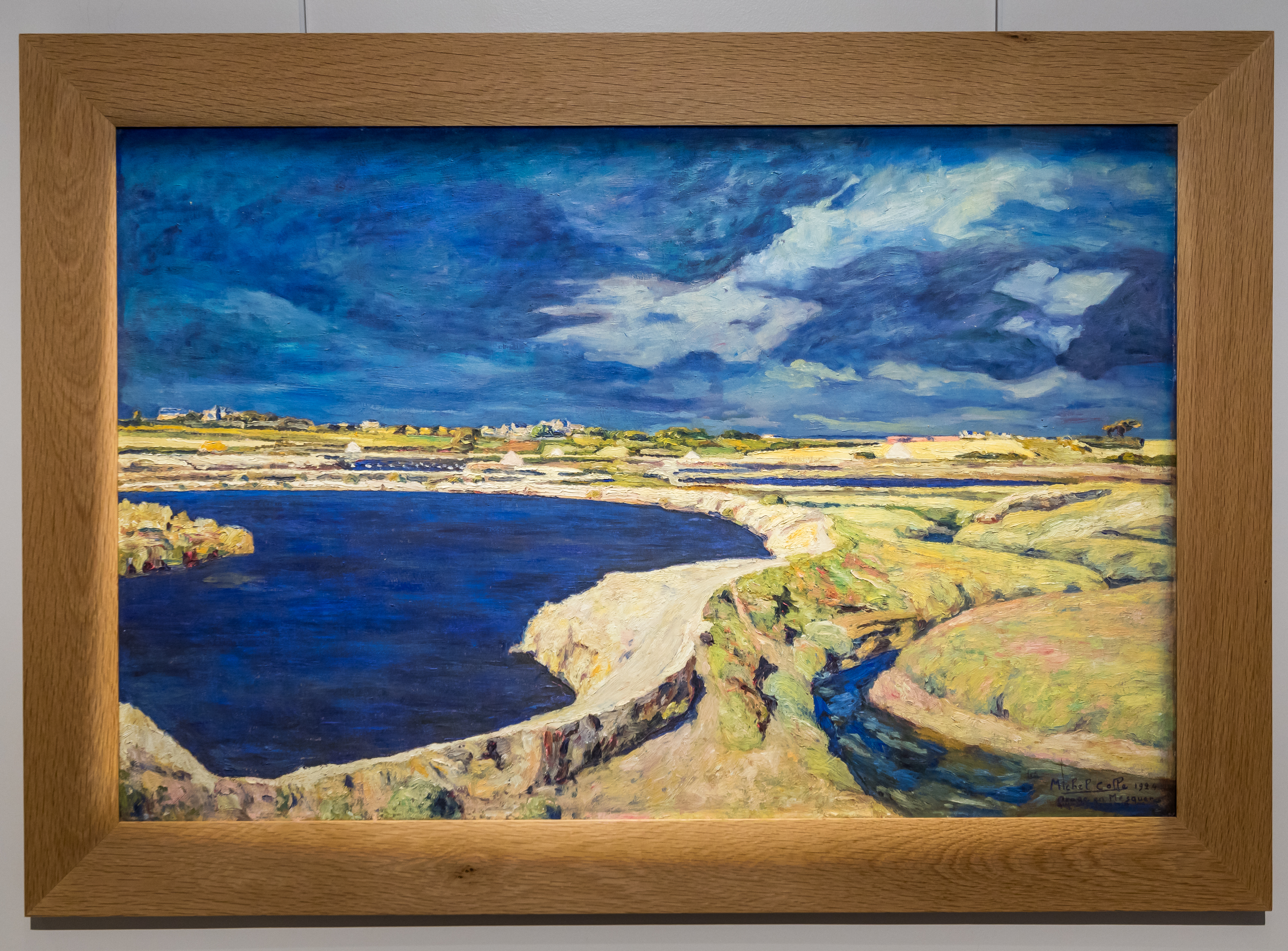
Orage en Mesquer, Musée des Marais salants

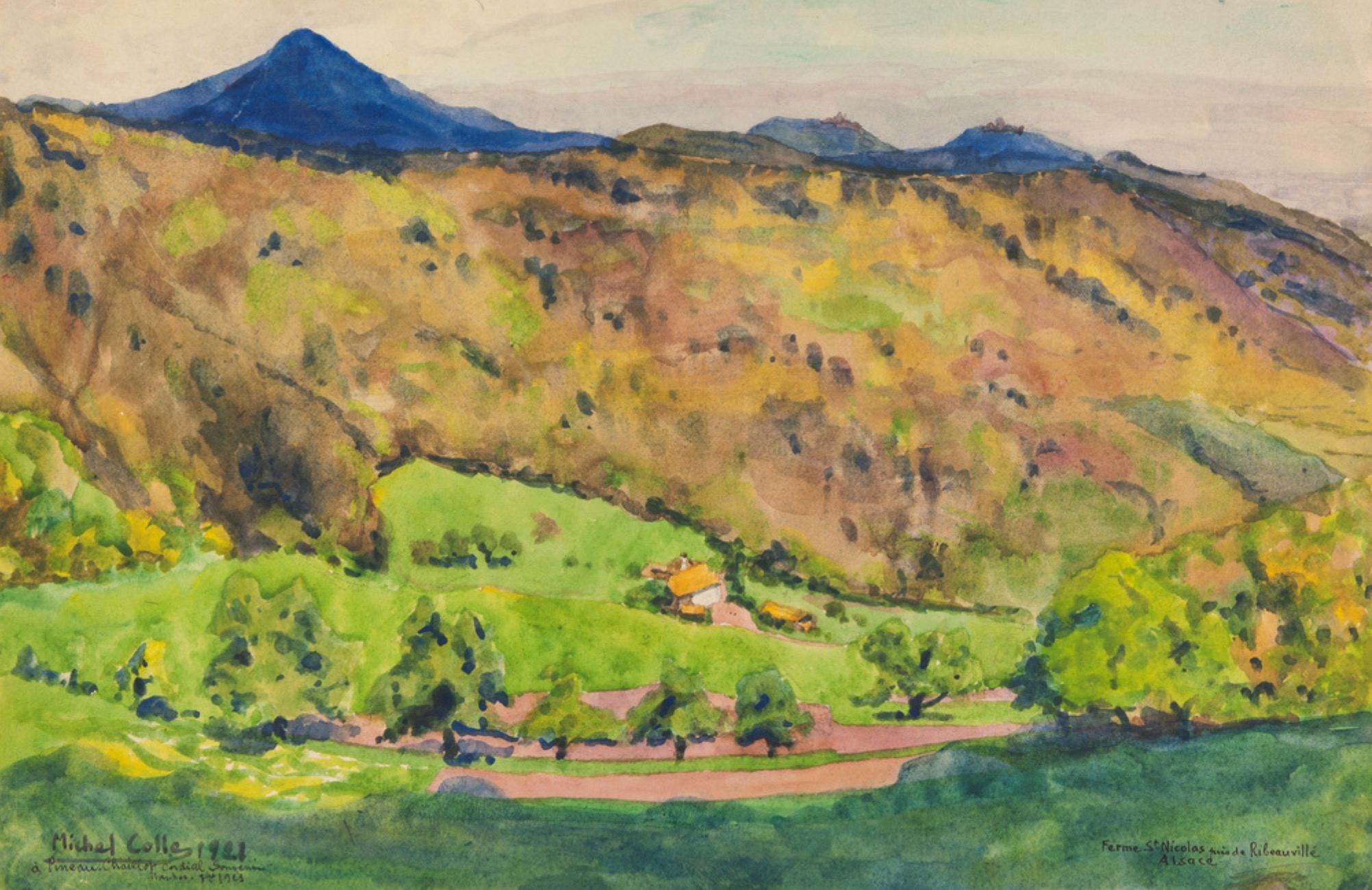
Ferme à Ribeauvillé, Musée d'Arts de Nantes, 1921

== Group Exhibitions ==
Salon de la Société Lorraine de Amis des Arts, regularly from 1896, with a retrospective in 1949

Salon de la Nationale des Beaux-Arts, 1903 to 1911 (No. 282 in 1906, with his "Vallée de la Meurthe à Baccarat")

Salon D'Automne, Paris 1906 (No. 373, "Place Carrière à Nancy")

Salon des Indépendants, 1907 with six pictures, No. 1157 to 1162; and many other years

Salon des Artistes Français, regularly after 1911, and at least as late as 1939, with a silver medal in 1921.

Carnegie Museum of Art, Pittsburgh, 1923 "22nd Annual International Exhibition of Paintings".

Salon des Tuileries, 1923 and 1928

Musée de Beaux-Arts, Rennes, 1961, "Peintres de Bretagne" (featuring the works of Colle, Mathurin Méheut, and Adolphe Beaufrère)

Musée de Beaux-Arts, Nancy, 1975, "L'impressionnisme en Lorraine"

Musée Départemental Breton, Quimper, 1999, "En Passant Par La Bretagne"

== Solo Exhibitions ==
Galerie Mosser, Nancy, 1923 (with Victor Prouvé); solo exhibitions in 1931 and 1934.

Galerie Georges Petit, June, 1924

Mignon-Massart Gallery, Nantes, 1942

Musée Nancy, 1946, Retrospective

Musée Galliera, Paris: Two retrospectives, the first in 1952 (with V. Guillaume), and the second, a solo exhibition, in 1953.

Musée des Beaux-Arts de Rennes, June - September 1961 "Michel Colle, 1872-1949" (with a published catalogue)

Musée des Beaux-Arts, Nancy, 1966, "Michel Colle"

Kaplan Gallery, London, 1971, followed by more exhibitions in 1972 and 1974, for which catalogues were published.

Galerie Corbin, Nancy, 1972, "Centenaire de las naissance de Michel Colle"

Musée Pierre Noël, Saint-Dié-des-Vosges, 2009, with "Des lumières de la Lorraine aux couleurs de la Bretagne"

Musée des Marais Salants, Batz-Sur-Mer, 2014, "Lights in Presqu'ile - Michel Colle, painter in Kervalet", with a published catalogue.
