= Jean Royère =

French designer (1902–1981)

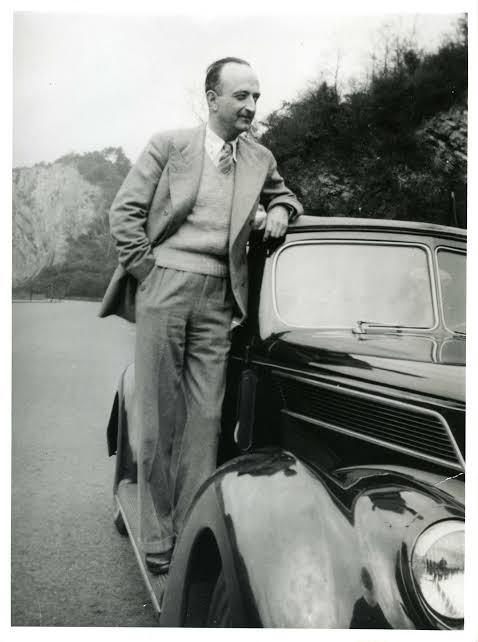
- Royère c. 1940
- Born: Jean Albert Théophile Royère; 3 July 1902; 8th arrondissement of Paris, France
- Died: 14 May 1981 (aged 78); Dauphin, Pennsylvania, U.S.
- Resting place: Santa Barbara, California, U.S.
- Education: University of Cambridge
- Occupations: Designer, interior decorator
- Years active: 1929–1981
- Known for: Furniture design
- Partner: Micha Djordjevic (1956–1981)
- Parent(s): Léonce Royère; Marguerite Niers

Jean Albert Théophile Royère (3 July 1902 – 14 May 1981) colloquially Jean Royère was a French designer and interior decorator who was primarily known as one of the leading figures of French 20th century decorative arts.

== Early life and education ==
Royère was born Jean Albert Théophile Royère on 3 July 1902 in the 8th arrondissement of Paris, France, an only child, to Léonce Royère, a civil servant of Breton stock, and Marguerite Royère (née Niers), into a Catholic family.

His father was a high-ranking official at the Paris Police Prefecture and originally from Brittany. His maternal family was originally from Lorraine and moved to Vienna, then Austria-Hungary, after the Franco-Prussian War. His upbringing was marked by a rigorous discipline and a carefully controlled environment.

He attended several prestigious secondary schools, including Condorcet, Fénelon, and Sainte-Marie-de-Monceau, where he received a formal education. Following his secondary education, Jean pursued law studies, which included a period at Cambridge University in the United Kingdom.

== Career ==
Coming late to his métier, at the age of 29, he left a secure job in the import-export trade to pursue a career in design.

Royère worked as a décorateur-ensemblier. He opened offices and galleries in the new centers of Beirut, Cairo, Sao Paulo, Lima and Saint-Tropez.

After completing his military service in France in 1925, he began working for his uncle, Jacques Raverat, who was the director of an import-export business in Le Havre, France. Jean worked there from 1926 until 1931

In 1931, encouraged by Louis Metman, the chief curator at the Musée des Arts Décoratifs in Paris, and supported by his uncle Jacques Raverat, Jean Royère decided to pursue his passion for interior design. He interned at a furniture factory on Boulevard Diderot. Thanks to this connection, he became familiar with different departments and gained knowledge about manufacturing techniques, pricing, and other aspects of the trade. His first project involved designing a bedroom and boudoir ensemble crafted from exotic woods for his uncle.

By 1932, Royère's talent was evident in his work for Dr. Philippe Decourt, for whom he created a modern, minimalist interior using tubing and chromed metal. Some of these designs were later adapted for mass production for the Aplemont workers' housing estate near Le Havre.

In 1933, Royère gained recognition for his renovation of the Hotel Carlton's brasserie on the Champs-Élysées. He designed the terrace, first-floor lounges, and basement with a pastel-toned decor and furnishings made of metal tubing, Bakelite, and rattan.

In 1934, Royère joined Pierre Gouffé, a renowned furniture manufacturer. They quickly developed a friendship, and Pierre was so captivated by Royère's work that he appointed him to oversee the contemporary division of his firm. Gouffé was part of a large, well-organised company with significant potential. While the company primarily specialised in period furniture, there was also a modern section—set up largely for Royère's benefit—which had its own store where he managed his clients alongside the company's. With Gouffé's support, Royère made his debut at the Salon d'Automne, winning a bronze medal for his chairs designed for Dr. Decourt. The following year, he exhibited at the Salon de la Société des Artistes Decorateurs.

These first two exhibitions went well, and Royère showed regularly at both salons until the Second World War began. Very early on, he had a stroke of luck that truly set him on his path. A design competition was held for the interior and furniture of a large café occupying the basement and first floor of the Hôtel Carlton on the Champs-Élysées—at a time when the Colisée had just opened in premises later occupied by Air France. Jean Royère unexpectedly won the competition, and despite having only two years of experience, he was entrusted with a major project. This marked his real start as a designer, bringing him numerous contacts, whereas previously he had only worked on small, private commissions.

Royère's reputation was solidified when his work was featured at the International Exhibition of Art and Technology in Modern Life held in Paris in 1937, making him one of the leading designers of his time.

In 1946, Jean Royère expanded his operations internationally, opening an agency in Cairo, followed by another in Beirut in 1947, which remained active for years. From Beirut, he extended his reach across the Middle East, working in Syria, Jordan, Saudi Arabia, and later Iran, where by 1958, he had transformed his agency into an independent branch.

His early projects in the region included designing a private apartment for King Farouk of Egypt. He later worked for several prominent leaders, including King Saud of Arabia, whom he began working for while the ruler was still a prince; King Saud's nephew, Prince Faisal; and King Hussein of Jordan during his first marriage to Princess Dina, whose parents Royère had previously worked for in Cairo. His clientele also included President Fuad Chehab of Lebanon before he assumed office, as well as the Shah of Iran and his daughter, Princess Shahnaz.

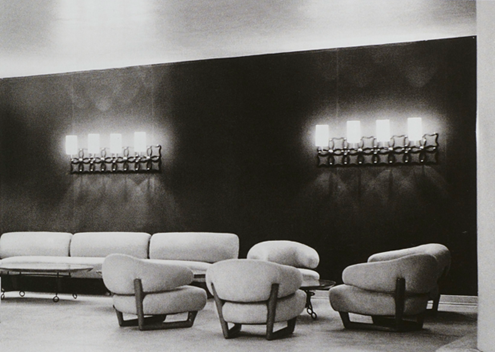
Lounge in the Shah of Iran's private cinema, Tehran, 1958

Jean Royère was involved in several significant projects across the Middle East, including work on France's consulate-general in Alexandria, Egypt. He considered the Baharestan,the Senate building in Tehran, completed in 1959, the most important of them all. The building itself was designed by Iranian architects Mohsen Foroughi and Heydar Ghiaï, both graduates of the École des Beaux-Arts in Paris, and Royère was responsible for all of the interior decoration. His collaborators included ironworker Gilbert Poillerat and metal sculptor André Bloc. The materials —such as glass, leather, gold duralumin, plastic coatings—and all the furniture were sourced from France, with the work being carried out under the personal supervision of the Shah of Iran.

=== World War II ===
Initially mobilized as an artillery sergeant at the Fort de Charenton, and later at Fontainebleau, after France's defeat, Royère returned to work for Pierre Gouffé. Using his work as a decorator as a cover, he was an active member of the Resistance until the end of the War. He used his trade as a cover to hide French Jews and English pilots.

== Work ==
Jean Royère's style absorbed the spirit of the times, creatively playing with modernist principles. It showcased a unique sense of proportion, texture, and colour, transforming ordinary elements into something entirely original and unprecedented. His style was characterised by a distinct flamboyance and a dream-like quality that set it apart from others.

Unlike many contemporary approaches that favoured minimalism and functionality, his unique style pursued a decidedly decorative path, emphasising aesthetic beauty and intricate details. Royère's designs are characterised by organic shapes and a whimsical elegance. He often drew inspiration from the animal and vegetal realms, creating pieces like the Éléphanteau armchair and the Champignon lamp, which exemplify his imaginative approach.

He was known for incorporating bright, contrasting tones into his creations, infusing spaces with warmth and vibrancy. This use of colour added a distinctive flair to his interiors and furniture, harmonising with the forms to create distinctive spaces composed of strong, sculptural spaces. Jean Royère's work often featured unconventional materials and techniques, such as perforated iron sheets and chromed metal, showcasing his willingness to experiment and push design boundaries. Through his imaginative designs and commitment to craftsmanship, Jean Royère left an indelible mark on 20th-century interior design, blending functionality with artistic expression.

Jean Royère was influenced by both French and foreign design traditions. Among French designers, he admired Djo Bourgeois for his simplicity and Émile-Jacques Ruhlmann, for his craftsmanship, though their styles differed significantly from his own. However, he acknowledged that foreign design had a greater impact on his work. Before World War II, he spent time in Norway, Sweden, and Denmark, where he was particularly struck by their techniques, refined taste, and approach to designing for everyday life—well before Scandinavian design gained recognition in France.

Despite these influences, Royère did not align himself with any particular design movement or theory. He dismissed labels such as "functional", "style", and "contemporary", believing that the only guiding principle in design was "getting things right", while the rest was, in his words, "just hot air".

=== Ours Polaire sofa and armchair ===
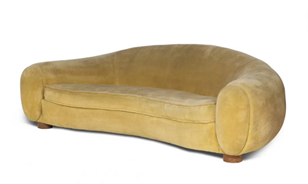
Jean Royère (1902-1981), Boule sofa, France, 1947

The Ours Polaire (Polar Bear) sofa, designed by Jean Royère in 1946 for his Paris home on Rue du Faubourg Saint-Honoré, was initially known as Boule or Banane before he adopted its iconic name. A first version of the Ours Polaire armchair was presented in 1942 at the Salon des Artistes Décorateurs. The sofa was officially showcased in 1947 at the Résidence Française exhibition, organised by Art et Industrie. The original model, from Royère's home, is now part of the permanent collection at the Musée des Arts Décoratifs in Paris,

=== Liane Wall Lamps ===
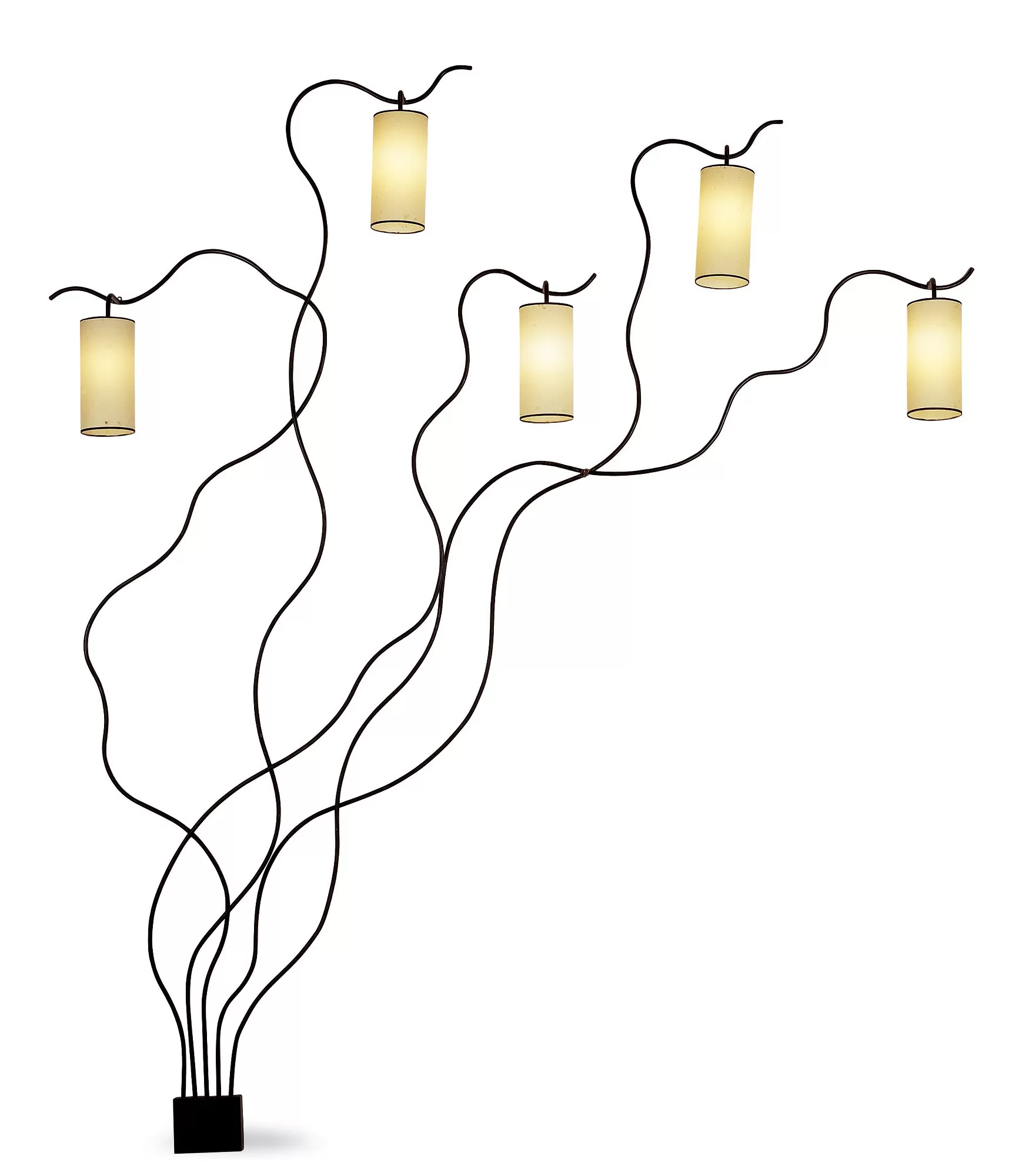
Jean Royère (1902-1981), Liane wall light, France, 1950-1955

The first model of the Liane wall lamp was created in 1953 for Le Capitole Hotel in Beirut, Lebanon. These fixtures were used in Jean Royère's interiors in the late 1950s and throughout the 1960s. In 1959, a floor lamp version of the Liane was introduced at the Salon des Artistes Décorateurs in Paris. In the years that followed, several other models of the Liane were designed including chandeliers, smaller sconces and floor lamps, following the same principles. A version of the Liane was acquired by the Musée des Arts Décoratifs in Paris and is now on permanent display in a dedicated room entitled Jean Royère: Hier et Aujourd'hui, along with other pieces owned by Royère himself including the original Ours Polaire sofa and a straw marquetry buffet.

== Personal life ==
In 1956 Jean Royère met Micha Djordjevic, who was studying at the Sorbonne, Paris. Micha, like Jean, came from a traditional, conservative family. He was outgoing, quick-witted, and had a great sense of humor, while Jean was more of an introvert. It was Micha who encouraged Jean to continue his work, helping him to navigate both the challenges and opportunities of his career. Micha's support nurtured Jean's creative output and also played a pivotal role in ensuring the legacy of Jean Royère's designs would continue to inspire future generations.

In the late sixties, Micha moved to Pennsylvania, to become a professor and to be closer to his brother and his family, who lived in Santa Barbara, California. It was there where Micha shared his passionate stories about Jean's work, travels, and experiences with family and in particular his nephew Vladimir Marković.

After his retirement in 1972, Jean split his time between France and the United States, joining Micha in Pennsylvania. During this time, he worked on organising his life opus into an archive, which included photographs, plans, drawings, gouaches, and sketches, all together more than twenty thousand documents. After prolonged correspondence with the Musée des Arts Décoratifs (MAD) in Paris, all of the material was donated in 1980, along with some of Jean Royère's most iconic creations, such as his own Ours Polaire sofa. That and other items are currently displayed in the dedicated room Jean Royère, Hier et Aujourd'hui.

Throughout his life, Royère traveled extensively, notably opening offices in Cairo, Beirut, Teheran, and Sao Paulo. Some of his most enthusiastic patrons included King Farouk, King Hussein of Jordan, and the Shah of Iran.

Jean Royère died peacefully at home in 1981. Micha Djordjevic died a decade later, and was laid to rest next to Jean, overlooking the vast horizon of the Pacific Ocean.

== Legacy ==
In 2018, a Royère cabinet was sold at Sotheby's Important Design auction in New York, where the "Étoile" sideboard, featuring intricate straw marquetry and an oak interior, sold for $1.8 million. The piece was commissioned in 1958 for the Dumont family.

In addition to the Étoile sideboard, Sotheby's offered a six-piece suite of Royère furniture from the Dumont residence, which included the Ours Polaire sofa and armchairs, Etoile straw marquetry tables in both high and low designs, and a set of six dining chairs. The sale culminated in a total of $13.7 million, the second-highest total in the history of Sotheby's various-owner design sales.

A rare 'Sculpture' sofa from circa 1955 was featured by Christie's in their auction entitled 'Paris in New York: A Private Collection of Royère, Vautrin, Jouve' on 26 May 2021. Additionally, Sotheby's showcased a Sculpture suite, comprising a sofa and two armchairs.

=== Auction sales ===
- Sotheby's: A rare Sculpture suite by Jean Royère sold for $3,720,000 USD on June 6, 2024.
- Christie's: An Ours Polaire suite by Jean Royère reached $3,420,000 USD on 9 March 2023. The set was from the private collection of collector and gallerist Adam Lindemann.
- Sotheby's: An Ours Polaire sofa sold for $746,000 USD on December 8, 2021. The piece was from the private collection of Peter Brant and Stephanie Seymour.

== Bibliography ==
- Françoise-Claire Prodhon, Jean Royère, éditions Galerie Patrick Seguin & Galerie Jacques Lacoste, Paris, 2012 (ISBN 978-2-909187-02-0)
- Patrick Favardin, Les Décorateurs des années 50, Norma éditions, Paris, 2002 (ISBN 978-2-909283-61-6)
- Pierre-Emmanuel Martin-Vivier, Jean Royère, Norma éditions, Paris, 2002
- Jean-Luc Olivie, Jean Royère, décorateur à Paris, Norma éditions, Paris, 1999
- Jean Royère " Cheminées et coins de feu ", Éditions d'Art Charles Moreau, Paris, c. 1950
