= Victor Prouvé =

French painter, sculptor and engraver (1858–1943)

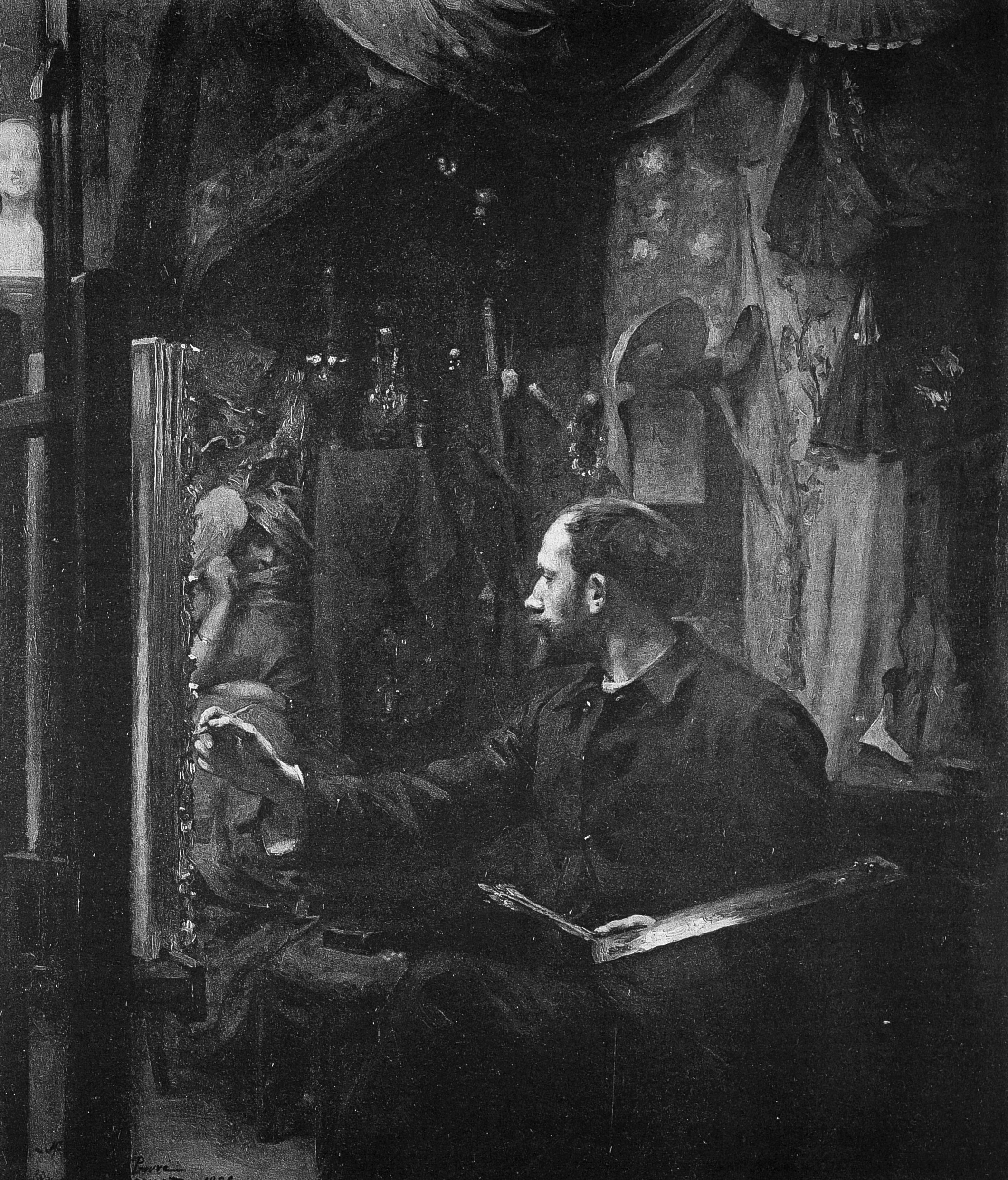
Victor Prouvé in his workshop

Victor Prouvé (French pronunciation: [viktɔʁ pʁuve]; 13 August 1858 – 15 February 1943) was a French painter, sculptor and engraver of the Art Nouveau École de Nancy.

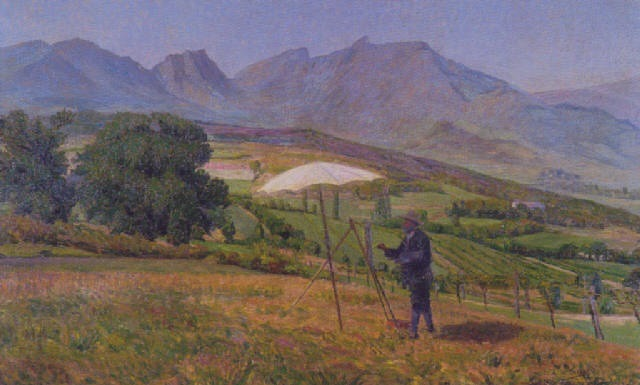
Victor Prouvè working en plein air near Chambèry in 1911 (painting by Auguste-Michel Colle)

His works are in many museums and private collections, including the Musée d'Orsay, the Centre Pompidou, the Metropolitan Museum of Art, the National Gallery of Art, Washington, and the Musée des Beaux-Arts de Nancy.

== Biography ==
He was born in Nancy. He designed decors of glass works and furniture for Émile Gallé and worked for Eugène Vallin, Fernand Courteix, the Daum Brothers, and Albert Heymann. He worked on book bindings with Camille Martin and the bookbinder René Wiener.

In 1888, Prouvé traveled to Tunisia, which influenced the light of his paintings.

In 1890, he went with the dissenting artists to the new Société des Beaux-Arts. He became the second president of the École de Nancy after Émile Gallé's death in 1904. From 1919 to 1940, he took the direction of the School of Fine Arts of Nancy.

Prouvé died at Sétif (Algeria) in 1943.

He was the father of architect and designer Jean Prouvé (1901–1984).

Beyond his contributions to painting and sculpture, Prouvé also ventured into jewelry design, creating pieces such as waist belts and brooches. His jewelry work displays a sculptural quality, characterized by intentional composition and fluid modeling. Crafted with precision by M. Rivaud, these creations reflect Prouvé’s distinctive approach to wearable art.

== Works ==
Selection of works by Victor Prouvé :

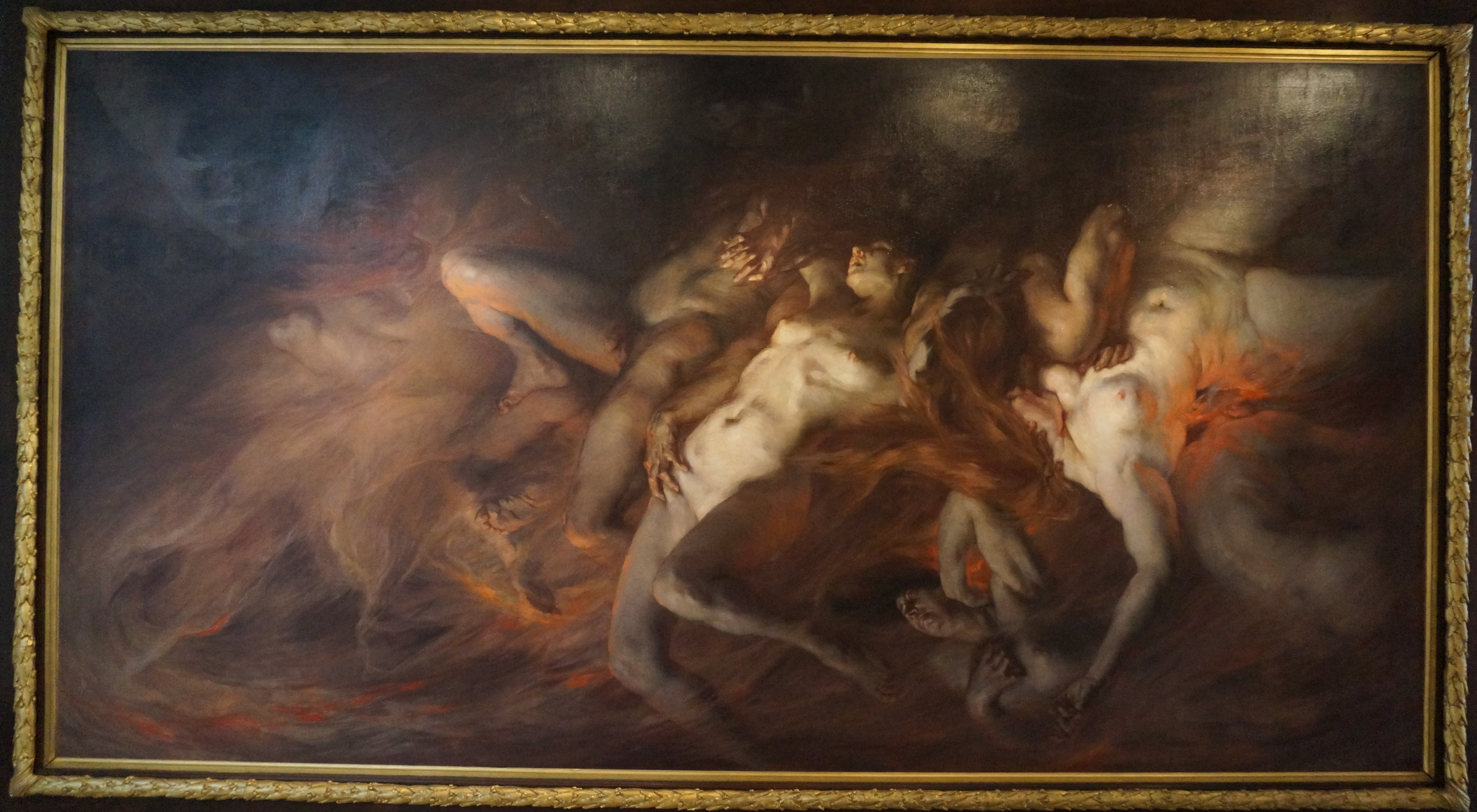
The voluptuous (1889)

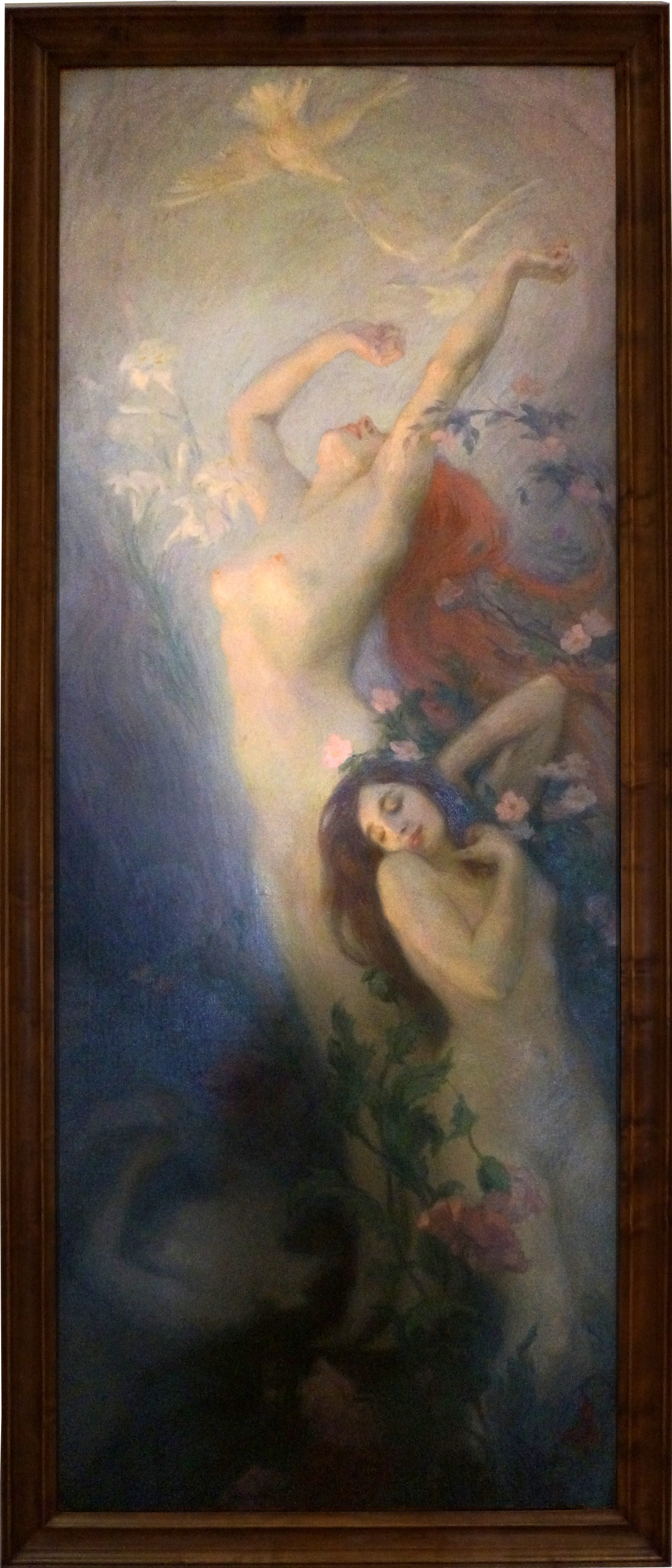
Dawn (L'Aube), 1900

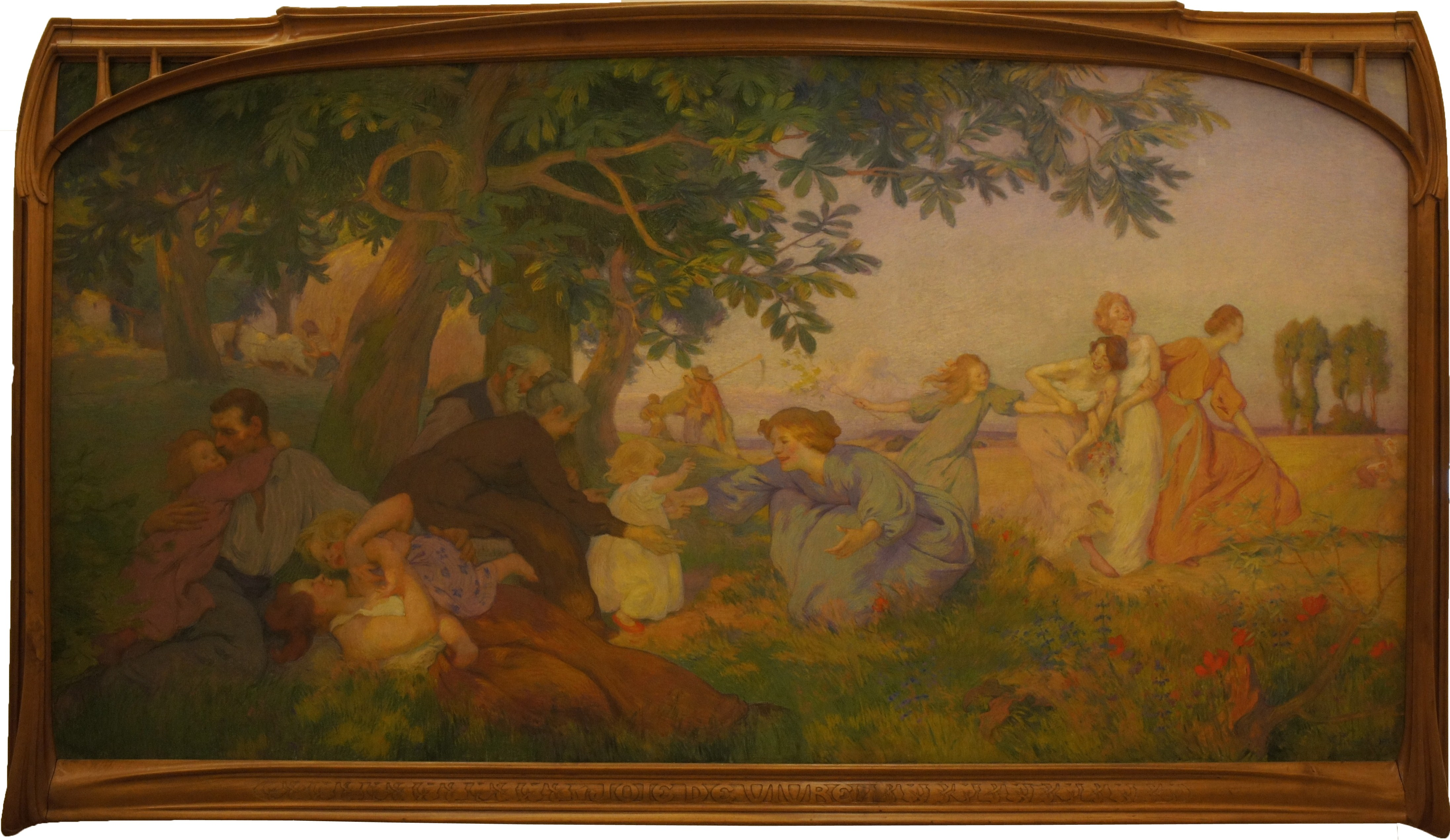
The joy of life (1904)

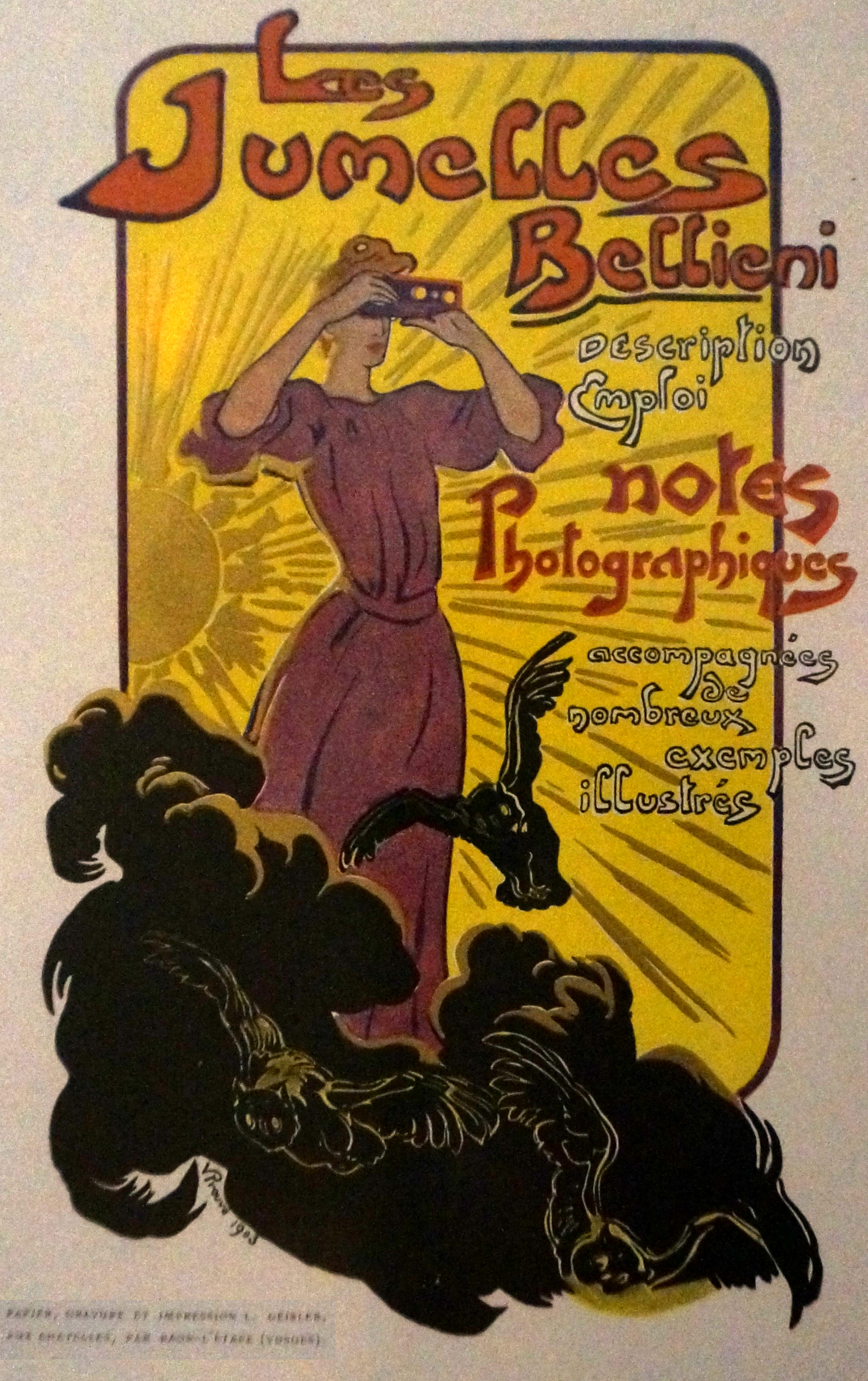
Poster for Bellieni binoculars (1903)

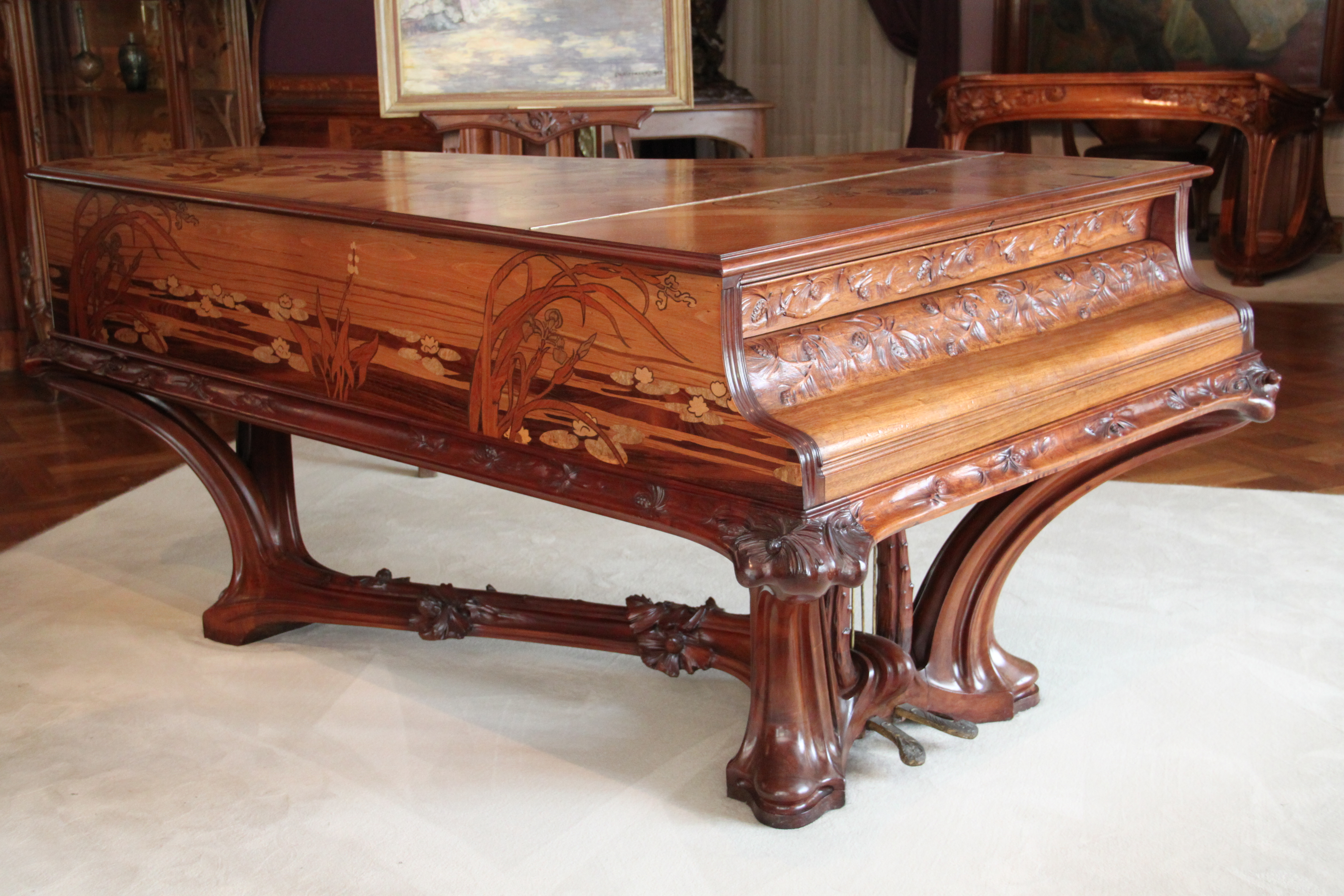
The death of the swan (1905)

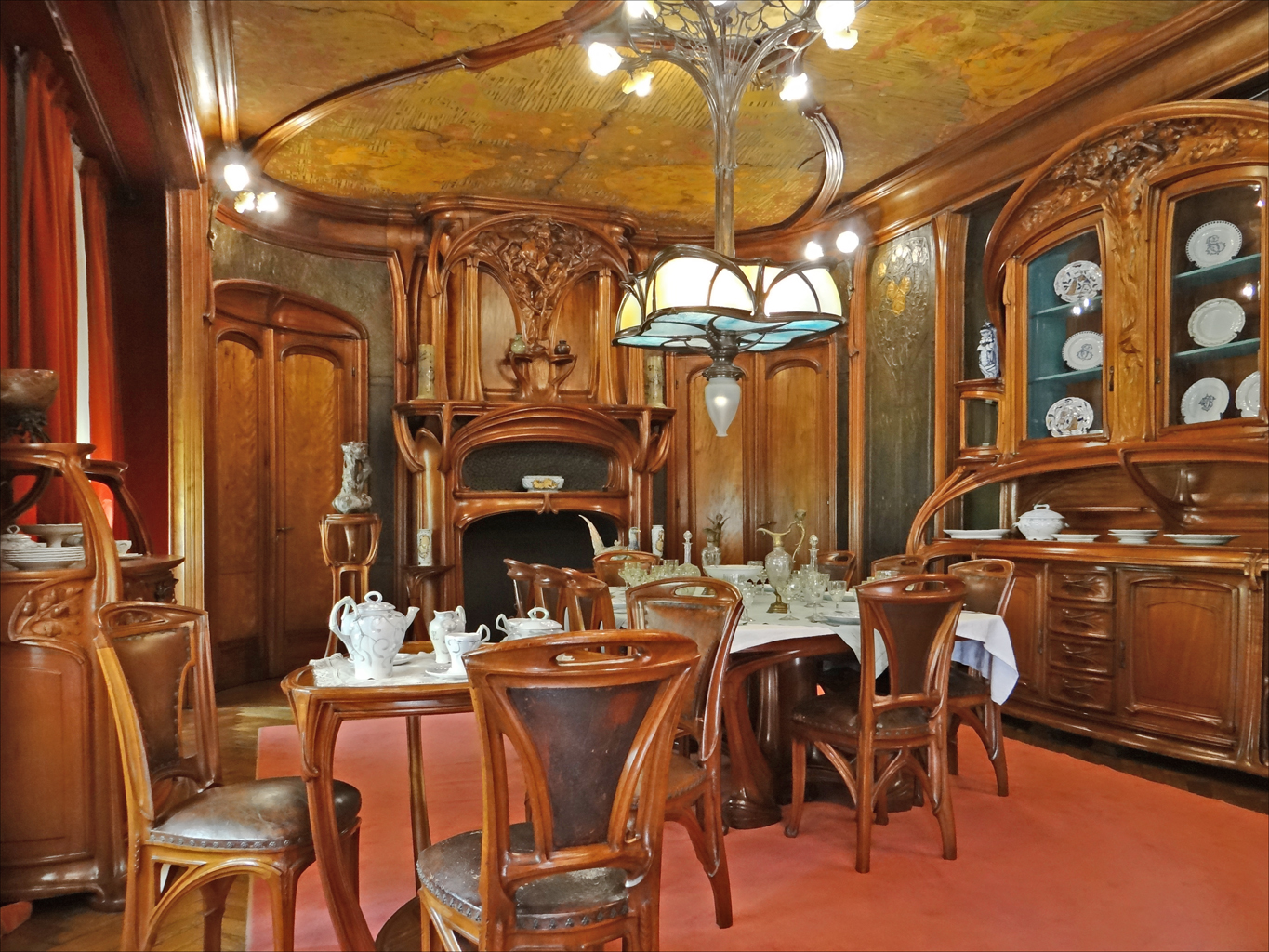
Masson dining room (1903-1906)

== Bibliography ==
- Edmonde Charles-Roux (et al.), Victor Prouvé : voyages en Tunisie (1888–1890): dessins, aquarelles, huiles, exhibition catalogue, Éditions Serpenoise (Metz), 1999, 95 p. ISBN 2876924129.
- Jean-Paul Midant, L'art nouveau en France, Les Éditions du Carrousel (Paris), 1999, 174 p.
- Madeleine Prouvé, Victor Prouvé, 1858–1943, preface of Jean Lurçat, Berger-Levrault (Paris), 1958, 204 p.
- Jean Perrin, « La collaboration entre Émile Gallé et Victor Prouvé », in Annales de l'Est, special issue, 2005, pp. 199–210
- Anne-Laure Carré, Victor Prouvé, 1858–1943, catalogue of the eponym exhibitions presented in Nancy from 17 May to 21 September 2008, Paris/Nancy, Gallimard/City of Nancy, 2008, 299 pages.
- Christian Debize, Dominique de Font-Réaulx, Sophie Harent, Emmanuelle Héran, Blandine Otter, Bénédicte Pasques, Jérôme Perrin, Philippe Thiébaut and Claude Tillier, Victor Prouvé (1858–1943), Gallimard, Paris, 2008, 306 p., 463 ill., ISBN 9782070120703.
- Danielle Birck, « École de Nancy : la preuve par Prouvé, Victor », on the site of Radio France International.
