= Jean Prouvé =

French architect (1901–1984)

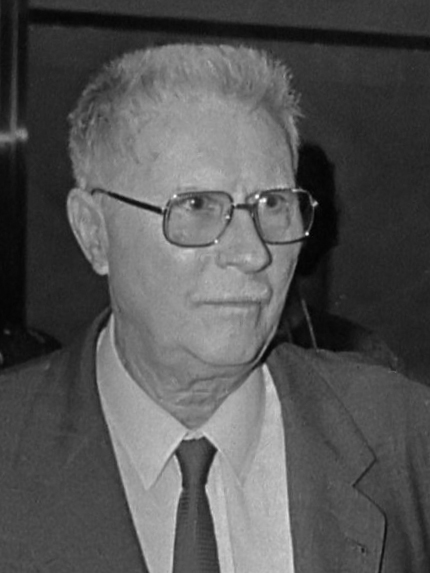
- Prouvé in 1981
- Born: 8 April 1901; Nancy, France
- Died: 23 March 1984 (aged 82); Nancy, France
- Spouse: Madeleine Schott
- Children: Claude Prouvé; Simone Prouvé
- Father: Victor Prouvé

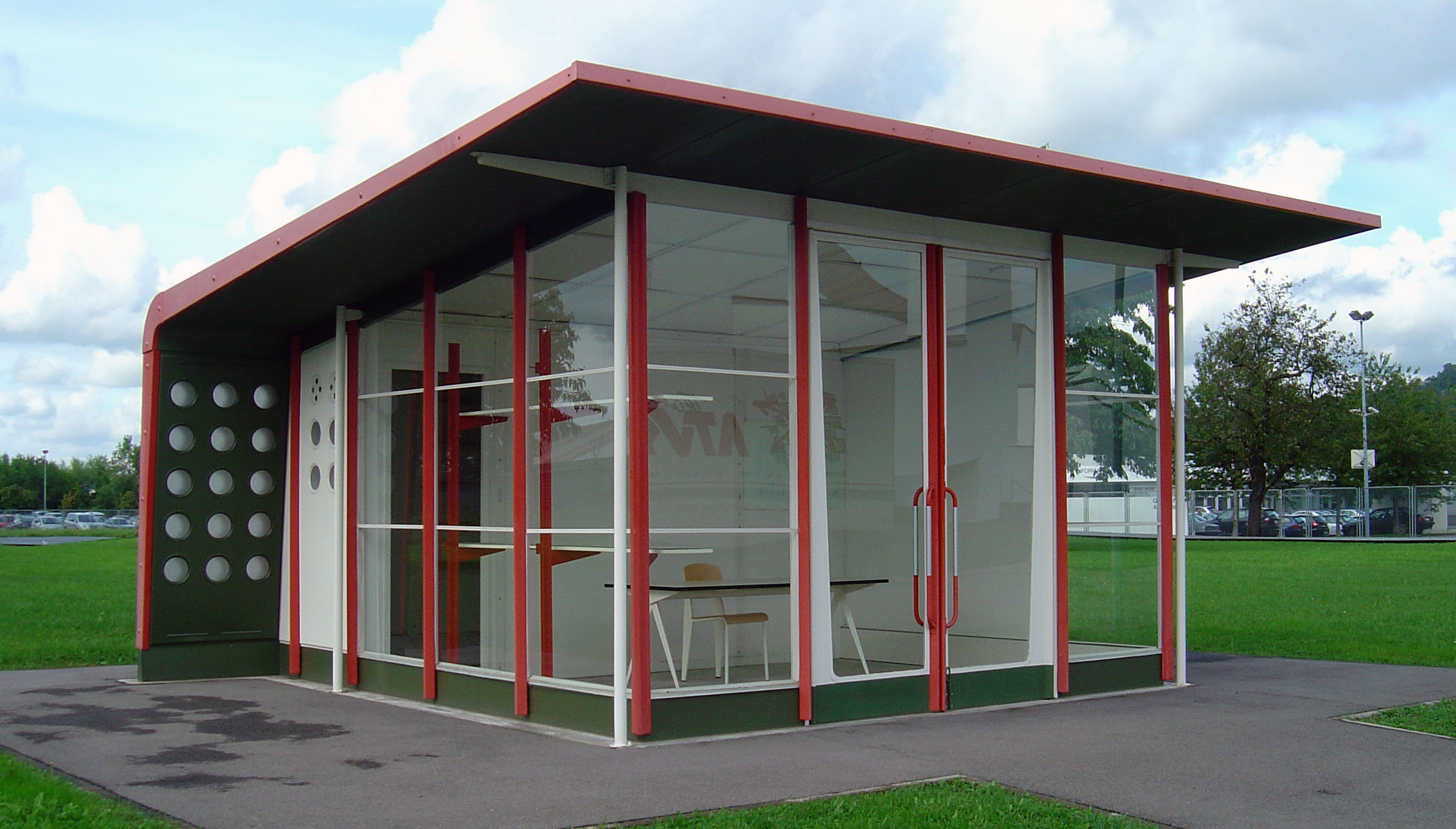
Prefabricated petrol station by Jean Prouvé

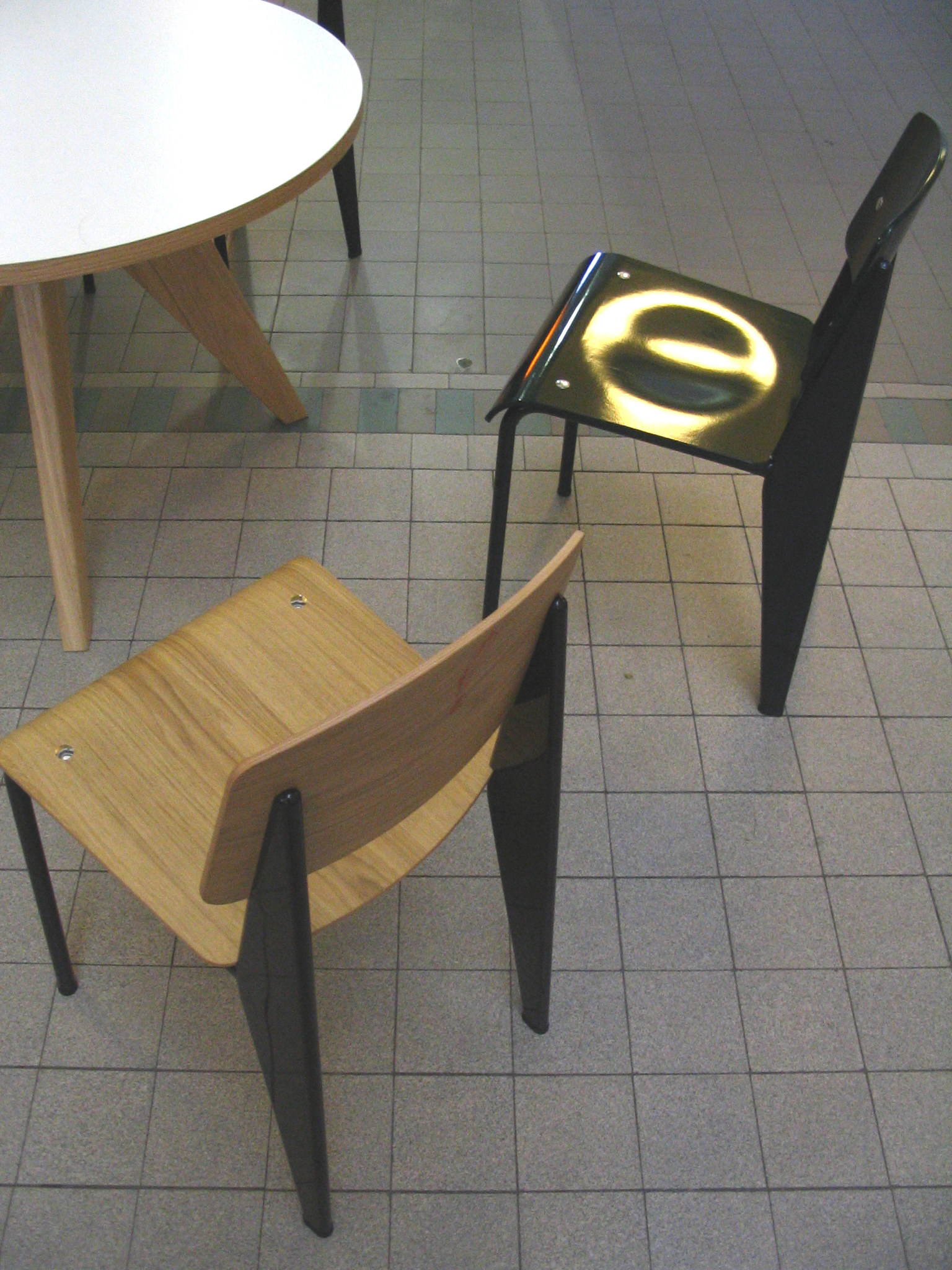
Chairs by Jean Prouvé

Jean Prouvé (French pronunciation: [ʒɑ̃ pʁuve]; 8 April 1901 – 23 March 1984) was a French metal worker, self-taught architect and designer. Le Corbusier designated Prouvé a constructeur, blending architecture and engineering. Prouvé's main achievement was transferring manufacturing technology from industry to architecture, without losing aesthetic qualities. His design skills were not limited to one discipline. During his career Jean Prouvé was involved in architectural design, industrial design, structural design and furniture design.

== Biography ==
=== Early years ===
Prouvé was born in Nancy, France, the second of seven children of the artist Victor Prouvé and the pianist Marie Duhamel. The Prouvés belonged to a lively artistic circle, which included the glass artist Emile Gallé, and the furniture designer Louis Majorelle. Jean grew up surrounded by the ideals and energy of the École de Nancy, the art collective to which his father belonged. Its goals were to make art readily accessible, to forge links between art and industry, as well as between art and social consciousness. Their tenets became ultimately a powerful influence on his body of work. "I was raised," Prouvé says, "in a world of artists and scholars, a world which nourished my mind."

=== Middle years ===
Between 1914 and 1917, Jean Prouvé spent three years in the school of fine arts of Nancy. Then, he was first apprenticed to a blacksmith, Émile Robert in Enghien (near Paris), and then to the parisian metal workshop of Aldabert Szabo. In Nancy in 1923 he opened what would be the first in a string of his own workshops and studios. He produced wrought iron lamps, chandeliers, hand rails and began designing furniture like his "Chaise inclinable" of 1924. As a craftsman in wrought iron, he was commissioned between 1923 and 1939 by local architects as Jean Bourgon, Pierre Le Bourgeois, Raphaël Oudeville or Alfred Thomas to contribute to their Art deco projects. He abandoned gradually the decorative style of that time to prefer smooth surfaces of folded metal plates. He used this material to design storefronts, elevators or furniture (for student housing in 1932, for example).

Jean Prouvé was also involved in the activity of the Comité Nancy-Paris between 1923 and 1927 with the architect Jacques André or the painter Etienne Cournault. He became a member of the committee in 1926.

He supplied the gates for the Verdun Memorial in 1928 and various parts for a number of buildings in Paris, including those designed by Robert Mallet-Stevens, for whom he produced the railings and gratings for the private mansions in Rue Mallet-Stevens in 1926.

In 1930 Prouvé helped establish the Union of Modern Artists whose manifesto read, "We like logic, balance and purity," although he shaped his public image around the idea that he was not married to a specific aesthetic. He opened the successful "Ateliers Jean Prouvé" in 1931 and began collaborating with French architects Eugène Beaudoin and Marcel Lods on projects such as the Maison du Peuple in Clichy, an aviation club and an army camp. He also collaborated with Charlotte Perriand and Pierre Jeanneret on a variety of furniture designs. The war kept "Ateliers" in business manufacturing bicycles and a stove called "Pyrobal" that could burn on any fuel. He favored the public sector in the growing areas of health, education and administration, which reflected a social ideal but also offered the economies of scale. By 1936 he was producing a catalogue of standard models for hospitals, schools and offices. The potential for mass production inspired Prouvé to develop and patent industrial products using folded sheet metal for the construction of buildings. These included movable partitioning, metal doors and elevator cages. When the French government announced the initiation of paid vacations for workers, Prouvé responded with the BLPS (1937–39), a prefabricated steel vacation home. Weighing less than two tons, the 3.3 square meter (35.5 square feet) structure could be put up or taken down by five workers in four to five hours. In 1939 he designed portable barracks for the French army. Later, "Ateliers Jean Prouvé" were commissioned by the Reconstruction Ministry to mass-produce frame houses for refugees. At a time when cheap, speedily built housing was needed all over the world, Prouvé was recognized as a leader in the field, alongside the North American designer R. Buckminster Fuller.

During the war Prouvé was also politically active as a member of the French Resistance and he was recognized for this involvement after the war by being named mayor of Nancy. He was also made a member of the Advisory Assembly after Liberation and made the Departmental Inspector for Technical Education.

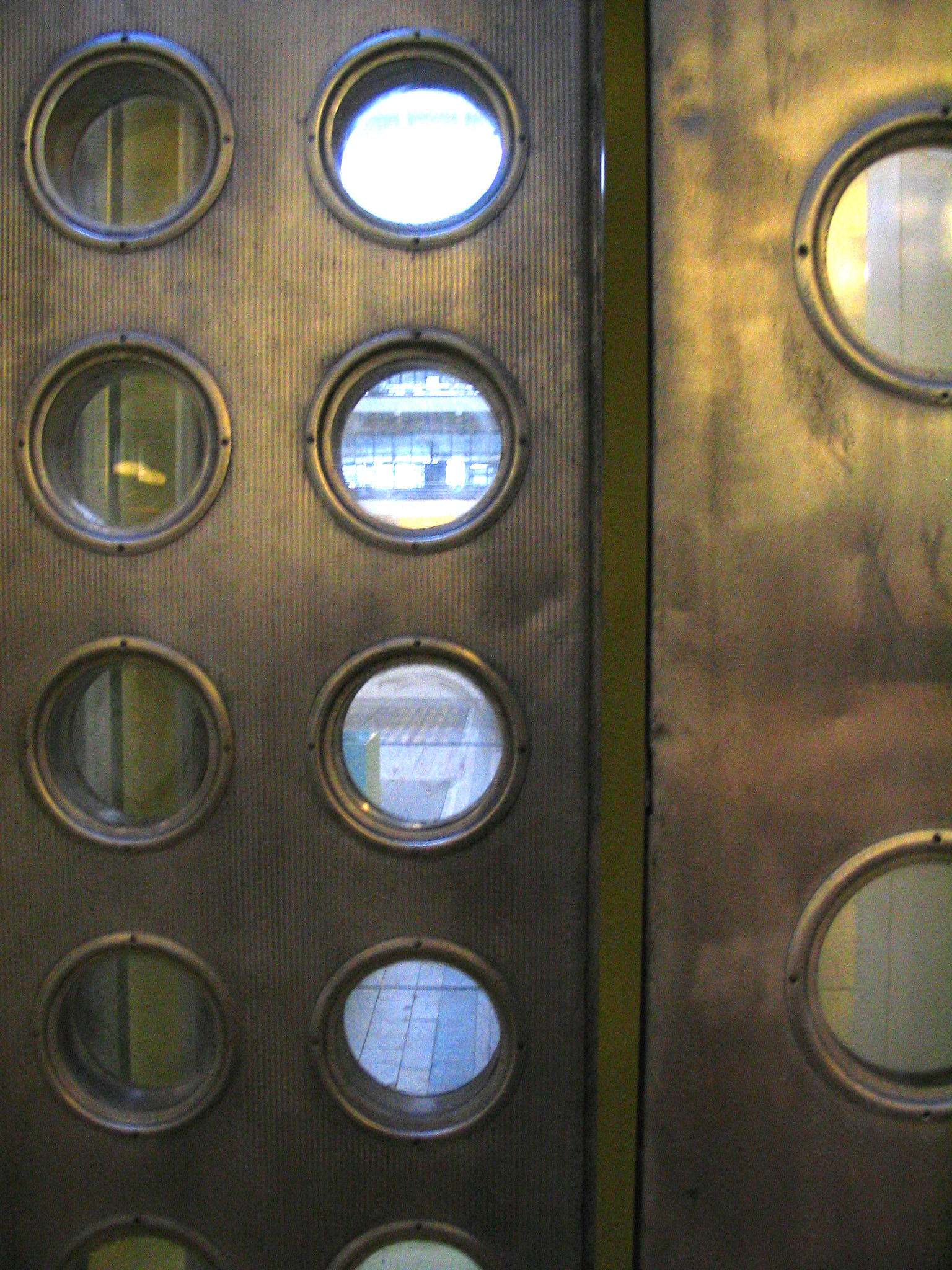
Façade detail of Maison tropicale

In the period after World War II (1939–45) there was increased interest in using new methods and materials for mass production of furniture. Manufacturers of materials such as formica, plywood, aluminum, and steel sponsored the salons of the Société des artistes décorateurs. Designers who exhibited their experimental work at the salons in this period included Prouvé, Pierre Guariche, René-Jean Caillette, Joseph-André Motte, Charlotte Perriand, Antoine Philippon and Jacqueline Lecoq. In 1947 Prouvé built the Maxéville factory where he produced furniture and undertook extensive architectural research on the uses of aluminum. In the Ferembal Demountable House (1948), designed as the offices of the eponymous tin goods manufacturer, steel portal frames form a structural core. In 1949, Prouvé and his brother Henri won a contract by the Ministry of Reconstruction and Urbanism to build a 14-lot subdivision at Meudon, just outside Paris, to demonstrate his prototype lightweight prefabricated metal building system.

Prouvé's studio built industrial buildings from aluminum and sent hundreds of aluminum sheds to Africa. He also designed an aluminum prefabricated house, the Maison Tropicale, for use in Africa. The purpose of the use of aluminum is to make it as lightweight as possible as it is a prefabricated house. The side panels slide, so depending on the time of day, it can help circulate air throughout the space. The circular holes in the facade detail allow for the sun to enter to create pockets of natural sunlight. The Maisons Tropicales were designed to address the shortage of housing and civic buildings in France's African colonies.

Prouvé designed and manufactured three prototype Maisons Tropicales for West Africa between 1949 and 1951. One was shipped to Niamey, capital of Niger, and two to Brazzaville, then capital of the French colony of Middle Congo. The two that went to Brazzaville were assembled on the same property—one as the house, the other as an office for a French company that sold aluminum products, including Prouvé structures. One of the Brazzaville structures and the house in Niamey were eventually disassembled and shipped back to Paris. The second, larger Brazzaville house is made from folded sheet steel and aluminium. For ease of transport all the parts were flat, lightweight and could be neatly packed into a cargo plane.

Prouvé's business failed in 1952, although Le Corbusier, one of his early clients, continued to consult him on technical matters. After Maxéville he started "Constructions Jean Prouvé". In 1953, he designed the facade of the restaurant of the Hotel de France in Conakry, Guinea, consisting of shutters that pivoted and opened on the sea. When clergyman Abbé Pierre made an appeal for donations to build emergency housing for homeless people during the winter of 1954, Prouvé designed the 'Maison des Jours Meilleurs' (A house for better days); measuring 57 square metres, with two bedrooms and a large living area, a few men equipped with simple tools could build the house in seven hours. Prouvé's response to a 1956 commission for a schoolhouse that could be easily dismantled and relocated, the asymmetrical Villejuif Demountable House (1956) is a lightweight project whose sheet-steel props support a cantilevered wooden roof. The school was later disassembled and its components used in other buildings.

The metal furniture of Jean Prouvé was produced copiously in every studio and workshop. His work involved frequent collaboration, most famously with Charlotte Perriand and Pierre Jeanneret. The style is set apart from the Bauhaus steel furniture of the time by his rejection of the steel tube technique. Prouvé had more faith in the durability and form of sheet metal, "bent, pressed, compressed than welded". His designs speak of a work philosophy that includes knowledge of the materials at hand, a commitment to collaboration between artists and craftsmen, an attention to evolving technical developments, and "the principle of never postponing decisions so as neither to lose the impetus nor indulge in unrealistic forecasts". Prouvé was influential in the development of the idea of nomadic architecture, likening a chair to a house, and designing both with portability in mind.

In 1957 Prouvé started the Industrial Transport Equipment Company and built the Rotterdam Medical School, the Exhibition Center in Grenoble and the Orly Airways Terminal façade. In 1958 he collaborated on the design of La maison du Sahara, a modern prototype of a house built for extreme climate conditions. Between 1952 and 1962 he collaborated with Jean Dimitrijevic on the Musée des Beaux Arts du Havre, a glass, steel and aluminum structure that received the prix Reynolds in 1962. In 1958, Prouvé collaborated with sculptor Alexander Calder to construct the steel base of La Spirale, a monumental mobile for the UNESCO site in Paris. Calder later gave Prouvé two mobiles—as well as a gouache with a dedication.

=== Late years ===
From 1957 to 1970 Prouvé lectured at the Conservatoire des Arts et Métiers in Paris. The most ambitious project he worked on during the last years of his life was the building for the Ministère de l’Éducation Nationale (1970), a metal skyscraper designed around a vast internal patio, which was to be built at La Défense. In 1971, Prouvé was the president of the Jury for the design of the Centre Pompidou in Paris. Along with fellow jury member Philip Johnson, he played a very important role for the choice of the winning project by Richard Rogers and Renzo Piano.

He died in Nancy in 1984.

== Legacy ==
Today, the Maison Jean Prouvé belongs to the City of Nancy, which rents it to an architect and their family on condition that the public can visit at certain times. Prouvé's workshop from his factory has been rebuilt in the grounds.

=== Art market ===
In 2007, Christie's announced that André Balazs, the New York hotelier, was the winning bidder in an auction for Maison Tropicale; Balazs reportedly paid $4.97 million for the house. Miuccia Prada and Richard Prince also both have versions of Maison Tropicale. Other notable private collectors include actor Brad Pitt, the gallery owner Larry Gagosian, and the fashion designer Marc Jacobs. In her New York office, Martha Stewart uses shelves and stools Prouvé designed for the French postal service.

=== Public collections ===
Prouvé's work is included in private and public collections worldwide, including Centre Pompidou, Paris and the Museum of Modern Art, New York. Permanent galleries devoted to Prouvé's work have been installed at the Musée des beaux-arts and Musée de l’Histoire du Fer in Nancy. In 2012, there were an exhibition of his ironwork at Musée de l’École de Nancy, an analysis of his impact on the city during and after World War II at Musée Lorrain and the installation of one of the prefabricated Maisons Tropicales he designed for use in Africa at Musée des beaux-arts.

=== Exhibitions ===
Major exhibitions include "Jean Prouvé: Constructeur, 1901–1984," Centre Pompidou, Paris (1990–91); "Three Nomadic Structures", Columbia University (2002); "Jean Prouvé: Three Nomadic Structures," Pacific Design Center, Museum of Contemporary Art, Los Angeles (2005); "Jean Prouvé: A Tropical House," Hammer Museum, Los Angeles (2006); "Jean Prouvé: The Poetics of the Technical Object," Vitra Design Museum, Weil am Rhein (2006–07, traveled to Museum of Modern Art, Kamakura & Hayama; Deutsches Architekturmuseum, Frankfurt; Netherlands Architecture Institute, Maastricht; Hotel de Ville de Boulogne-Billancourt, Paris; Design Museum, London; and Museo dell'Ara Pacis, Rome, among other venues); "Ateliers Jean Prouvé," Museum of Modern Art, New York (2008–09); a multi-exhibition, multi-venue tribute at Musée des beaux-arts, Nancy (2012); and "A Passion for Jean Prouvé: From Furniture to Architecture," Pinacoteca Agnelli, Turin (2013). The exhibition "Jean Prouvé: Architect for Better Days" exhibited at the LUMA Foundation in Arles from 20 October 2017 to the Spring of 2018.

== Death ==
Jean Prouvé died at the age of 82, on 23 March 1984, in Nancy. He is buried in the Préville cemetery, located in the same city.

== Bibliography ==
- Jean Prouvé 8x8 Demountable house - edition Galerie Patrick Seguin, 2013
- Jean Prouvé 6x6 Demountable house - edition Galerie Patrick Seguin, Paris 2013
- Prouvé/Nouvel-Ferembal House (édition Galerie Patrick Seguin, Paris 2011).
- Jean Prouvé (éditions Galerie Patrick Seguin, Paris - Sonnabend Gallery, New York 2007)

== Images ==
- Maison de la Tunisie Bench-Bookshelf 1952
- Many houses photos from Gallery Patrick Seguin
