= Peter McCleary =

American scholar in the fields of engineering and architecture

- Born: May 17, 1938 (age 88); Scotland
- Occupation: Scholar . Engineer . Professor Emeritus
- Employer: University of Pennsylvania School of Design

Peter McCleary (born May 17, 1938, in Barrhead, Scotland) is a scholar in the fields of architecture and technology. He is currently a professor emeritus at the University of Pennsylvania School of Design, where he taught since 1965.

A Visiting professor in architecture at the Technical University of Munich since 2008, in 2011 he held the TÜV SÜD Stiftung (Foundation) Professorship.

== Life and career ==
McCleary studied Applied Mathematics, Civil and Structural Engineering at the University of Glasgow, University of Strathclyde, and the Imperial College London. He later pursued a Master of Architecture at the University of Pennsylvania School of Design.

Following his studies in engineering he worked at The Building Group, a section of Ove Arup's engineering consulting firm "Ove Arup and Partners". He would later work for Arup Associates (now known as the Arup Group). Among the projects he contributed to are London's Barbican Centre and the Sydney Opera House. He latter worked under Frank Newby at Felix James Samuely's Office.

In 1964, he joined the faculty of Architecture at the University of Pennsylvania to teach courses in the field of structures and to assist Robert Le Ricolais. He graduated in architecture in 1971, became a Full Professor in 1974, and Professor Emeritus in 2008.

During his tenure at UPenn, this "engineer with profound architectural and historical interests" taught Structures and Philosophy of Technology courses, supervised design studios and Ph.D. research. He served as the chair of the then Graduate School of Fine Art (today's University of Pennsylvania School of Design) Architecture Department from 1974 to 1982, and was the founder of the Program in Historic Preservation in 1981. In addition, he held the position of Chair of the Ph.D. in Architecture from 1982 to 1988, Director of the Master of Architecture post-professional degree in Emerging Technology from 1998 to 2001, and of the Paris Program in Architecture from 1980 to 2007.

McCleary served on many advisory boards, including the T.C. Chan Center for Building Simulation and Energy Studies, the Aga Khan Middle East Program in Architecture in Jordan, the Building Arts Forum Conference in New York, the Presidential Design Awards, and the Association of Collegiate Schools of Architecture. He taught at several American and European schools, including the Massachusetts Institute of Technology, Parsons The New School of Design, University of Arizona, University of Hawaii, University of Houston, University of Miami, Rensselaer Polytechnic Institute of Technology, Rice University, École Polytechnique Fédérale de Lausanne (Switzerland), McGill University, and the Technical University of Munich (Germany), where he served as the TUV-SUD Foundation Professor in 2011.

McCleary published widely on the work of Louis I. Kahn, Robert Le Ricolais, Philosophy of Technology, Structures and Architecture, and Architectural Education among other themes. A festschrift and conference, "The Engineering of Architecture", was organized in his honor.

== Design and consultancy ==
Peter McCleary has worked as an architectural and engineering consultant for various firms and projects throughout his career. Notable collaborations include his involvement in Louis Kahn's project for the Venice Congress Hall, Weiss/Manfredi's Women in Military Service for America Memorial in Washington D.C., and partnerships with Bernard Huet, Jean-Marc Lamunière, Patrick Mestelan, Brauen + Waelchli, James Carpenter, and others.

McCleary has a specific interest in bridges and trusses. He designed the Pedestrian Bridge over the railway at Penn Park in 1980, which received the Master Builder in Steel Award.

== Exhibitions ==
He was the curator of the exhibition "Visions and Paradoxes: The Structural Research of Robert Le Ricolais" that premiered in 1997 at the Architectural Archives of the University of Pennsylvania. Until 2002, this exhibition traveled to various locations including the Colégio Oficial de Arquitectos de Madrid in Spain, the Royal Danish Academy of Fine Arts and Aarhus University in Denmark, the KTH Royal Institute of Technology in Stockholm, the Ecole Polytechnique Federale de Lausanne in Switzerland, the Illinois Institute of Technology in Chicago, and the University of Arizona in Tucson.

== Honors and awards ==
The Association of Collegiate Schools of Architecture (ACSA) recognized his contributions multiple times namely with the Distinguished Professor Medal in 1994. In 2011, he became a Fellow of the Institute for Advanced Studies at the Technical University of Munich.

== Selected publications ==
- Vers une meilleure comprehension de la corde et de la poutre a treillis. In Perennites: Textes offerts a Patrick Mestelan, 292–301. Lausanne: Presses Polytechniques et Universitaires Roman epfl des, 2012.
- Designing for Complexity. In RBSD Architects: Selected Projects 1908-2018, 3–7. New York: RBSD Architects, 2008.
- Some Characteristics of a New Concept of Technology. In Rethinking Technology: A Reader in Architectural Theory, edited by William W. Braham and Jonathan A. Hale, 325–336. Routledge, Oxford and New York, 2007.
- Post-Scriptum. In Jean-Marc Lamuniere: Regards Sur Son Oeuvre, edited by Bruno Marchand, 54, 66, 210–211. Gollion, Switzerland: Infolio Editions, 2007.
- Performance (and Performers) in Search of Direction (and a Director). In Performative Architecture: Beyond Instrumentality, edited by Branko Kolarevic and Ali M. Malkawi, 215–225. New York: Spon Press, 2005.
- In Search of Essences. In Ueli Brauen and Doris Waelchli. 1999-2004. Neuchatel: Edition Virages Neuchatel, 2004.
- Robert Le Ricolais’ Suche nach der ‘unzerstorbaren Idee’. In Die geometrische Form: Strukturentwicklung aus Wirkungsprinzzipien der Natur. Arch + 159/160. Aachen, Germany (Mai 2002): 64–68.
- Robert Le Ricolais’ Search for the ‘indestructible idea’. In On Growth and Form: The Engineering of Nature. School of Architecture, University of Waterloo, Canada. (October 2001): 1.
- A la recherche d’un système universel de l’ordre. In Louis Kahn: Silence and Light: Actualite d’une pensée, Cahiers de Theorie 2/3. Presses polytechniques et universitaires romandes, Lausanne, 2000: 86–92.
- Robert le Ricolais et le quête de l’« idée indestructible ». In L’Architecture et La Ville: Melanges offerts a Bernard Huet. Ecole D’Arch. de Paris-Belleville, Editions du Linteau, Paris (2000):161-169.
- Thoughts on an Architecture of Glass. In A+U, Architecture and Urbanism No. 352. Japan (January 2000): 6–11.
- Some Characteristics of a New Concept of Technology. In Classic Readings in Architecture, edited by J.M. Stein and K.F. Spreckelmeyer, 169–179. McGraw-Hill, Boston (1999).
- Robert Le Ricolais e la ricerca dell’ « idea indistruttibile ». In Lotus International 99, Milan, Italy (Jan. 1999): 101–110.
- Le Ricolais; Visions and Paradox (Visioner og Paradoks) in Ten essays on Le Ricolais. Kunstakademiets Arkitektskole, Aarhus, Denmark (September 1998): 8–3.
- Visiones y Paradojas (Visions and Paradox): Robert Le Ricolais. Fundacion Cultural, Collegio Oficial de Arquitectos de Madrid. (Oct. 1997): 21–122.
- Entre construcción y arquitectura: El Kimbell Museum. In Louis I Kahn, edited by Maurizio Sabini, 103–112. Ediciones del Serbal, Barcelona (1994).
- Lineage and Themes in the Bridges of Santiago Calatrava. In Design Book Review, Poetics of Structure, No. 28 (Spring 1993): 19–24.
- Introduction and ‘some characteristics of a new concept of technology’. In Let’s Open a window into the third millennium. SOMFY International Symposium. Dublin (21-25 April 1993): 1V-1 to 9, V111-5.
- The Differing Projects of Life of the Architect and the Engineer. In Bridging the Gap: Rethinking the Relationship of Architect and Engineer. Proceedings of the symposium held at the Guggenheim Museum, April 1989. Edited by Building Arts Forum / New York. Van Nostrand Reinhold, New York (1991): 37–48, 49–56. https://archive.org/details/bridginggaprethi0000buil/page/174/mode/2up?q=mccleary
- Observations on M.S. Degree Programs. In Post-Professional and Doctoral Education in Architecture. Edited by Linda N. Groat, College of Architecture and Urban Planning, University of Michigan, (July 1991): 29–32.
- Some Characteristics of a New Concept of Technology. In Journal of Architectural Education, Volume 42, No. 1. Association of Collegiate Schools of Architecture, Washington, D.C. (Fall 1988): 4–9. https://doi.org/10.2307/1424994
- Louis Kahn's Kimbell Art Museum: Between Building and Architecture. In Design Book Review (Winter 1987): 48–51.
- The Role of Technology in Architecture. In The Rowlett Report 86, Proceedings of the Rowlett Lectures. Texas A & M University, (April 1984), 4-21.
- History of Technology. In Architectural Research, chapter 6. Edited by James C. Snyder. New York: Von Nostrand Reinhold, Co. Inc. (1984): 81–91.
- An Interpretation of Technology. In Journal of Architectural Education, Volume 37, No. 2. Association of Collegiate Schools of Architecture, Washington, D.C. (Winter 1983): 2–4. https://doi.org/10.2307/1424738
- Structure and Intuition. In AIA Journal, The American Institute of Architects. Washington, D.C. (Oct. 1980): 56–59, 119.
- On G. Robert LeRicolais. In Visionary Drawings of Architecture & Planning: 20th Century through the 1960s. Edited by George R. Collins, M.I.T. Press. Cambridge, Mass. (1979).
- A Quantitative Methods for the Design of Buildings with Comfortable Microclimates: By Passive Control of Solar Effects with M. F. Agha and N. Lior. In Proceedings of the 2nd National Passive Solar Conference. Edited by Don Prowler. Univ. of Penn., Phila. (March 1978): 404–409.
- Structures in General. In Structures and Architectural Education - In Search of Directions, School of Architecture Publications, Vol.1, No.1. Carleton University, Ottawa, Canada. (October 1974): 55, 81–83.
- Some Principles of Structure (exemplified in the work of R. Le Ricolais). In Zodiac, No. 22. Milan (1973): 57–69.
- La Dimension Significative. In L'Architecture d'Aujourd'hui, No. 161. France (April–May 1972): 13–16.
- The Significant Dimension. In Architectural Design, Vol. 43. London (February 1972): 108–111.
- Structural Clarity. In Architectural Design, Vol. 41. London (March 1971): 170–172.
- Chiarezza espressiva della strutture. In Casabella, Edition 352. Milan (September 1970): 43–46.
- Structures: Recherches Experimentales a L'Université de Pennsylvanie, U.S.A. In Techniques et Architecture, 30 series No. 5. Paris, France (June 1969): 56–58.
- Investigations on Automorphic Compression Members. Research project sponsored by the American Iron and Steel Institute. Center for Architecture & Building Research, Institute for Environmental Studies, University of Pennsylvania. (October 1968): 1-57.
