= Achille Mauzan =

French painter

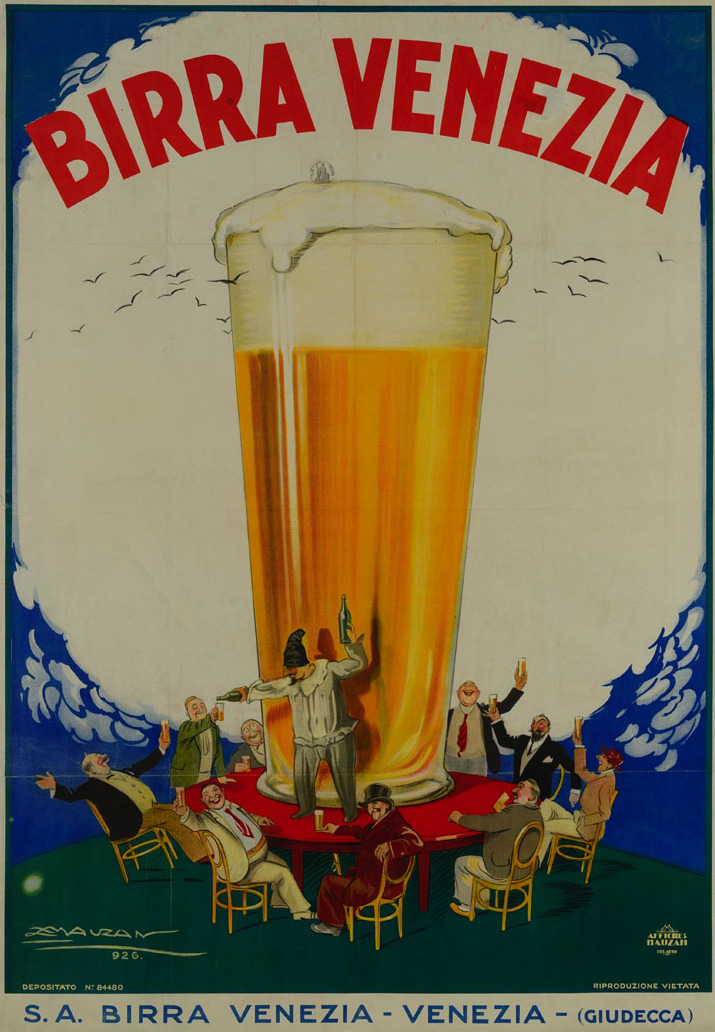
- Poster by Lucien-Achille Mauzan
- Born: 15 November 1883; Gap, Hautes-Alpes, France
- Died: 15 June 1952 (aged 68); Gap, Hautes-Alpes, France
- Known for: Painting, graphic design
- Movement: Liberty style

Signature
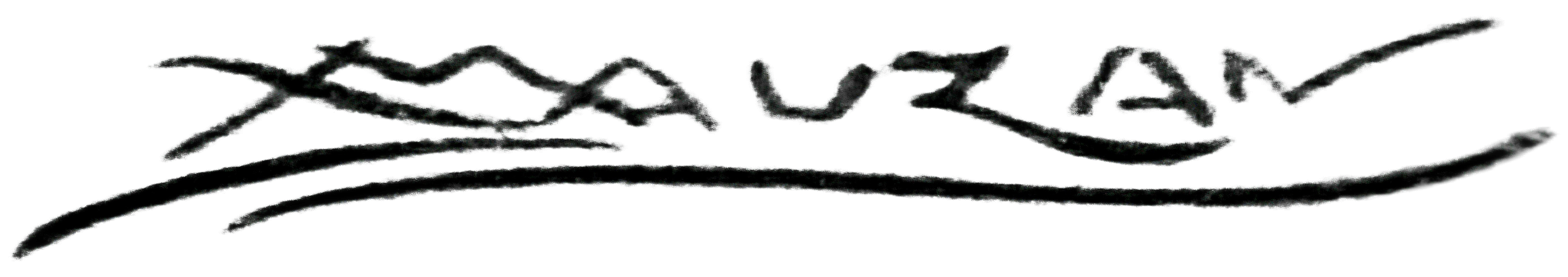

Achille Lucien Mauzan (1883, in Gap, Hautes-Alpes – 1952, in Gap) was born on the French Riviera, but moved to Italy in 1905, known as a decorative illustrator designing during the Art Deco movement, though he also painted and sculpted.

After a period of study in the École des Beaux-Arts at Lyon, France, Mauzan divided his life between Milan, Paris and Buenos Aires. Between the years 1920 and 1940, the period between the wars, he used forms and materials under the influence of the avant-garde cubists. He was also an illustrator of posters and postcards.

During his career as a poster printer and designer, Mauzan designed over 2,000 posters, using a style marked by humor and brilliant colors for advertisement and events and over 1,000 postcard images. He made several important posters for the Italian film industry in Turin, and then went to work at Ricordi music publishing from 1912 to 1917. Later, from 1919 to 1923 he worked in the Magical press (Giovanni Magagnoli). In 1924 in Milan he established with Morzenti his own publishing house, the Mauzan-Morzenti Agency. In 1926 he travelled to Argentina and set up the "Affiches Mauzan" (Mauzan Posters) publishing house where many of his greatest works were created and where he worked until 1932. Within those years, Gino Boccasile, one of his students in Milan, travelled to Argentina at his insistence and set up a studio. Mauzan is also noted for designing several war posters including an adaptation of the famous Lord Kitchener poster.

== Biography ==
Advertisement c. 1930s, many of his greatest works were created in Buenos Aires

- 1905: Travelled to Italy, where he settled and started working. His productions were essentially illustrations of magazines, postcards, bronze or plaster ceramics. After moving to Turin he turned to production to the newly formed film industry. As an outstanding lithographer, he produced about 1500 posters of films between 1909 and 1913, including posters of silent films.
- 1912 to 1917: worked in Milan for Ricordi, a music publishing company.
- 1914 to 1918: (World War I): he designed postcards and posters on loan.
- 1919 to 1923: works for Maga printing and publisher (Giovanni Magagnoli).
- 1924 to 1927: founded with Angelo Morzenti his own publishing house for his posters: Agence Mauzan-Morzenti, (Mauzan-Morzenti Agency).
- 1927: Departure to Buenos Aires, where he organized an exhibition, promoting its own talent. He founded his own company, Editorial Affiches Mauzan (Editorial Mauzan Posters), and produced numerous posters. It thus reaches the figure of 2,000 posters produced and published.
- 1930: through his talent, he joined with Cosmos advertising agency, "the largest advertising agency in South America", and created a new department: Nuevos Affiches Cosmos (New Cosmos Posters).
- 1931: he organized the exhibition New Trade Expo of the Food Industry and embarks on a project with the Historical Museum in Buenos Aires.
- 1932: he leaves Argentina to join his wife who dies in Italy. During his five years spent in Buenos Aires, he marks deeply in the poster art in Argentina, where his reputation is enormous.
- 1933: after a vague period, he moved to Paris, where he remained unknown. Artists like Cappiello, Jean d'Ylen, Cassandre, Loupot, Carlu and Colin were having more media exposure, his production was very sporadic.
- 1933 to 1935: Under contract with the Société Générale Publicité, (General Advertising Company) and with Paris-Affiches, (Paris-Posters)
- 1939 to 1945 (World War II): after sharing between Paris and Gap, he retired in the latter where he devoted himself entirely to his first love: painting.

== Selected lithographs ==
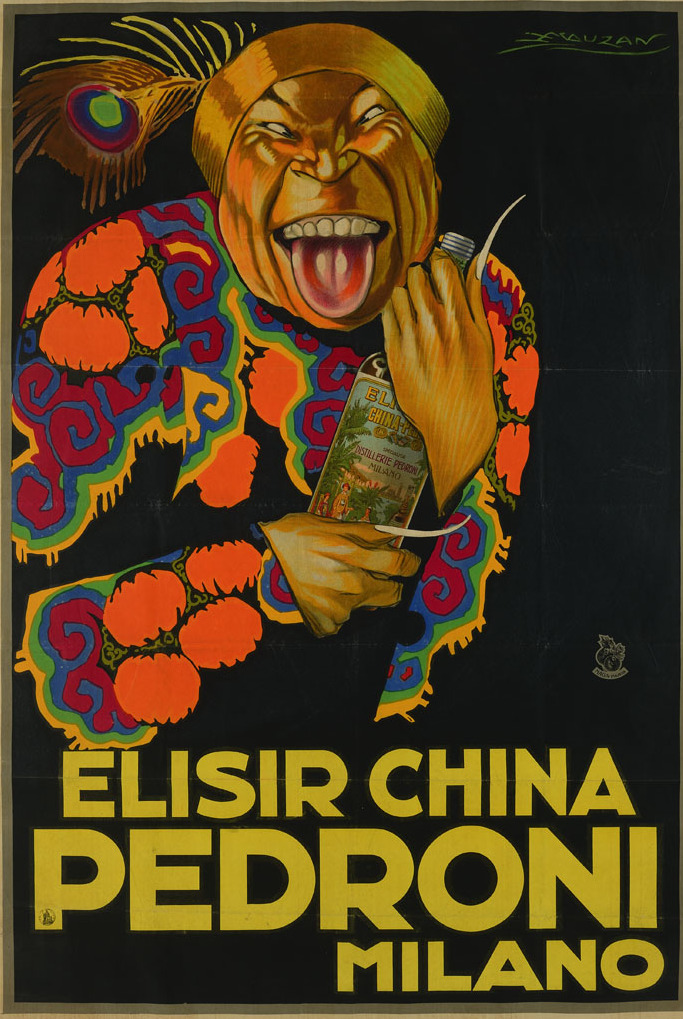
Advertising poster for Elisir China Pedroni, 1920.

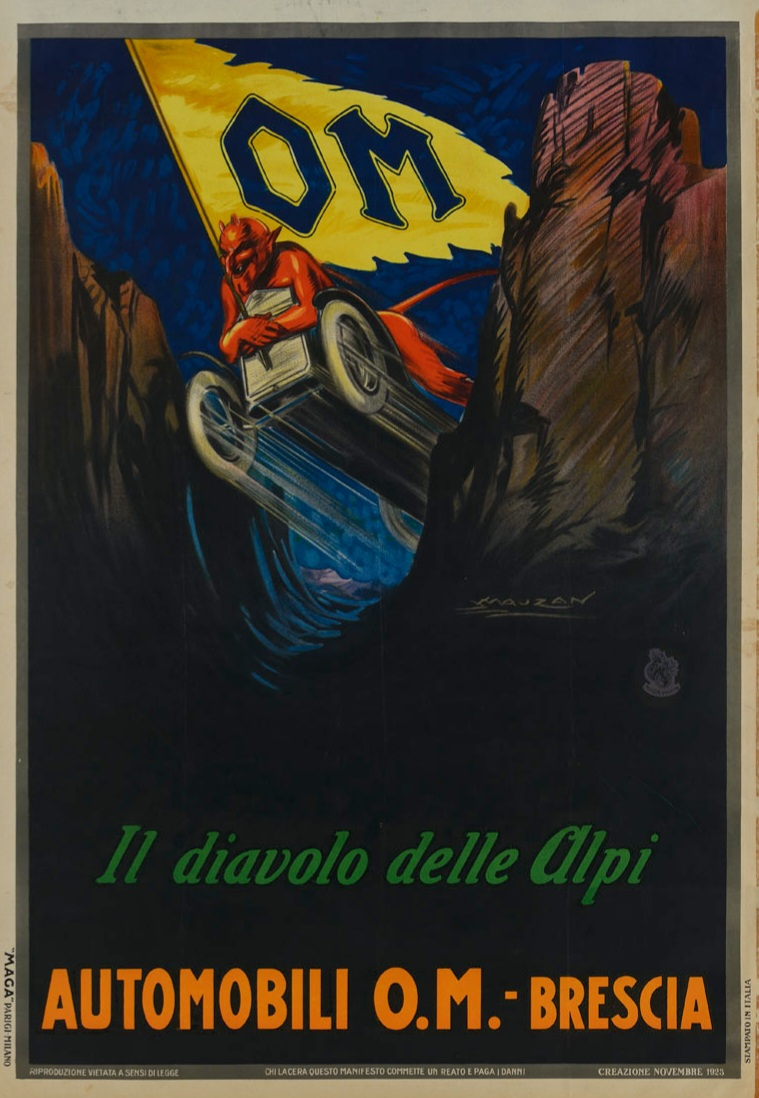
Poster Advertising OM Cars, 1920.

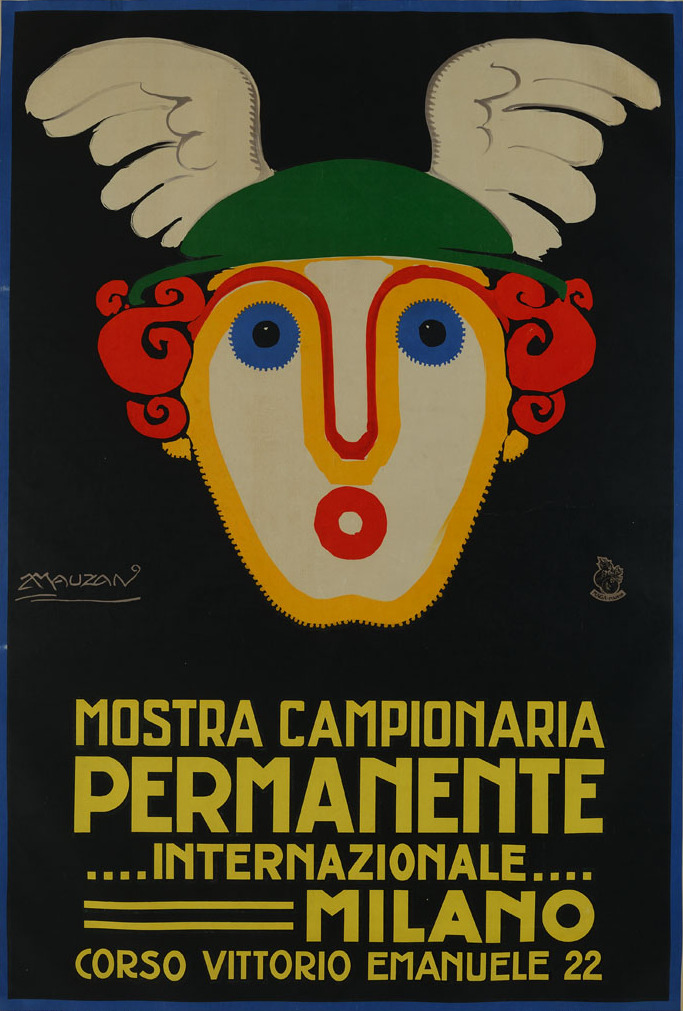
Advertising poster for Fiera Milano, 1921.

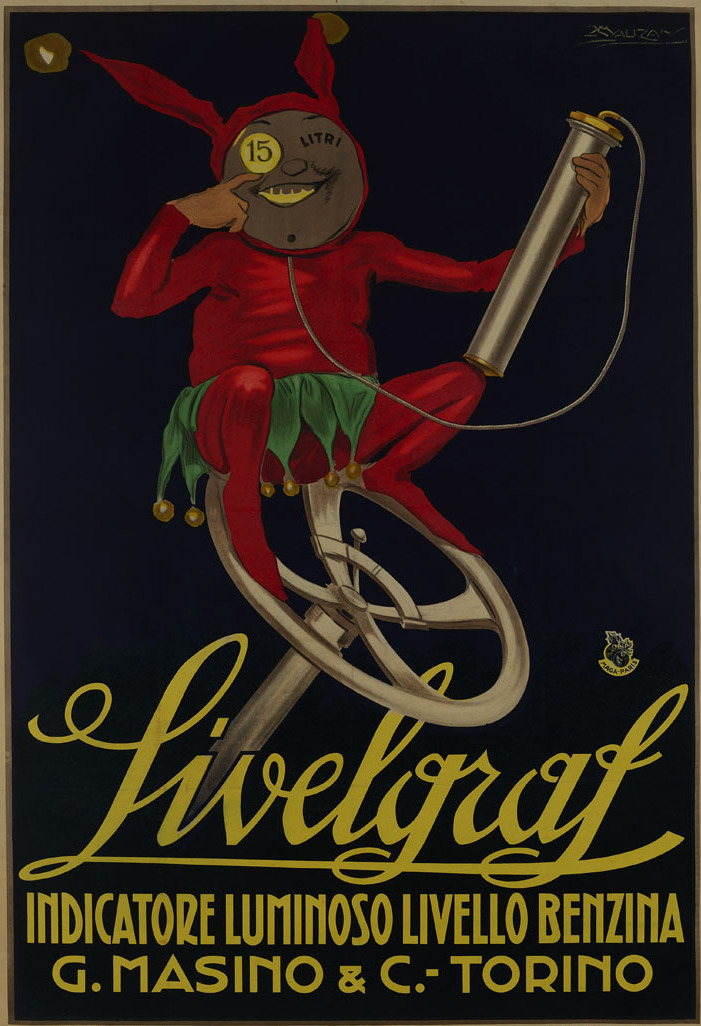
Advertising poster for Livelgraf, 1921.

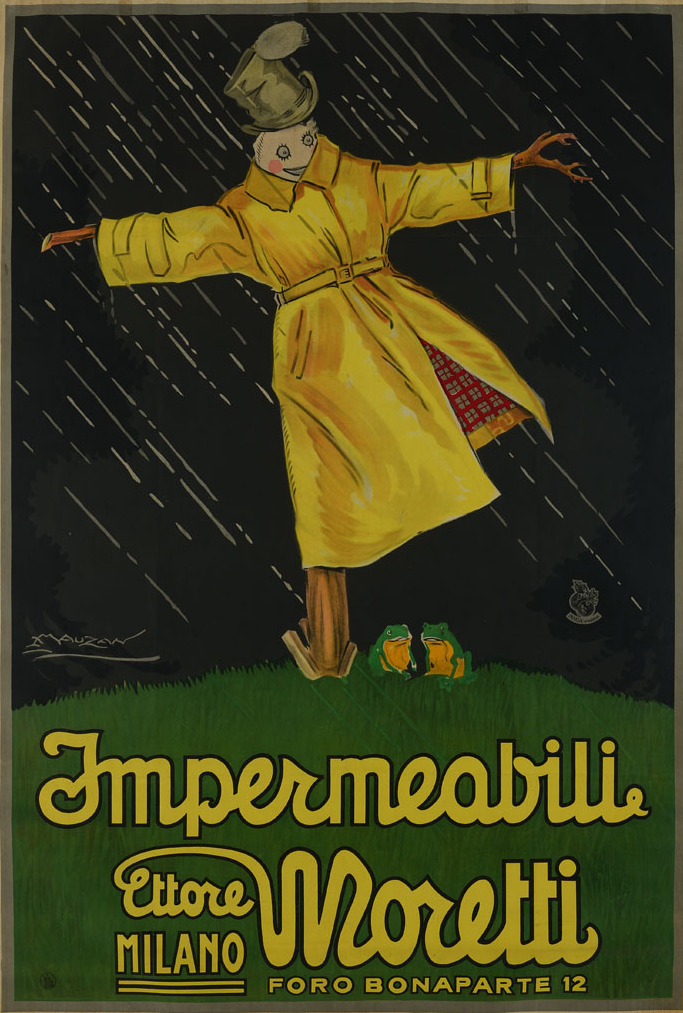
Advertising poster for Impermeabili Moretti, 1921.

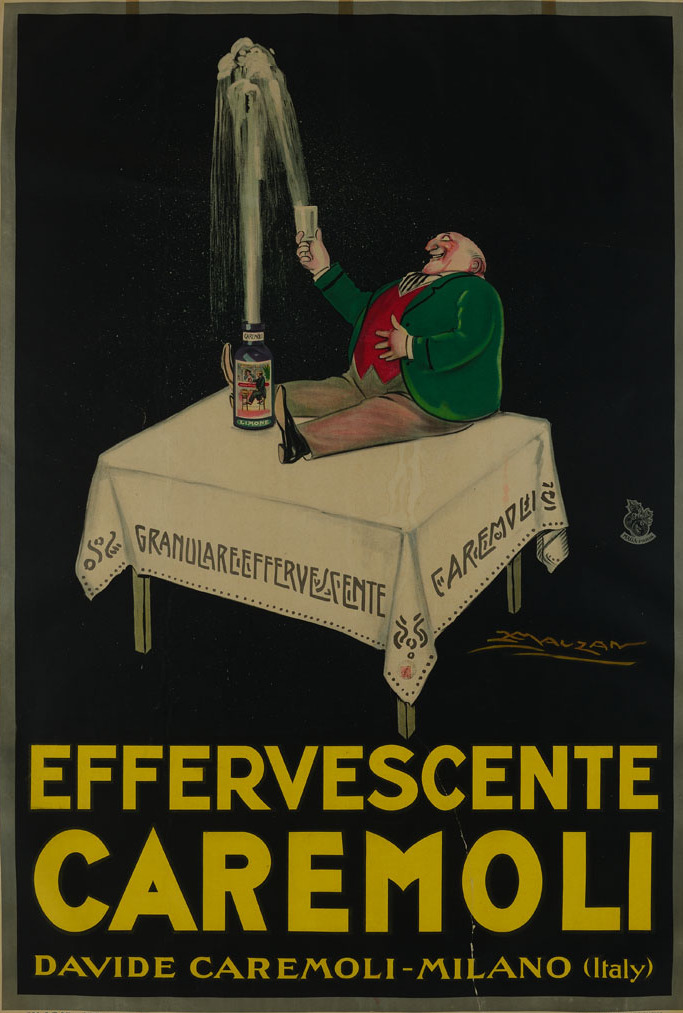
Advertising poster for Effervescente Caremoli, 1922.

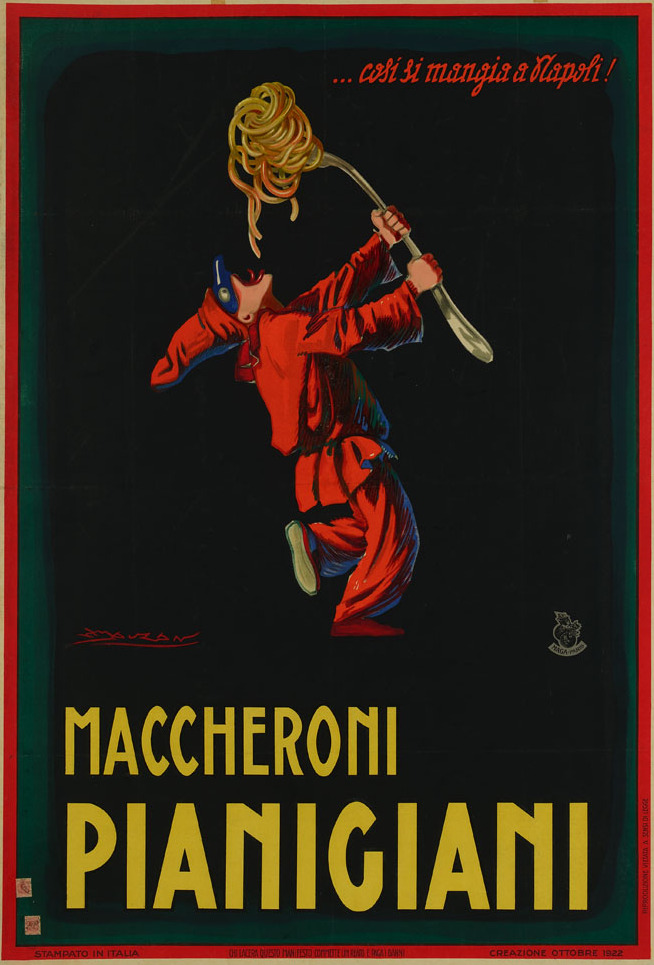
Advertising poster for Maccheroni Pianigiani, 1922.

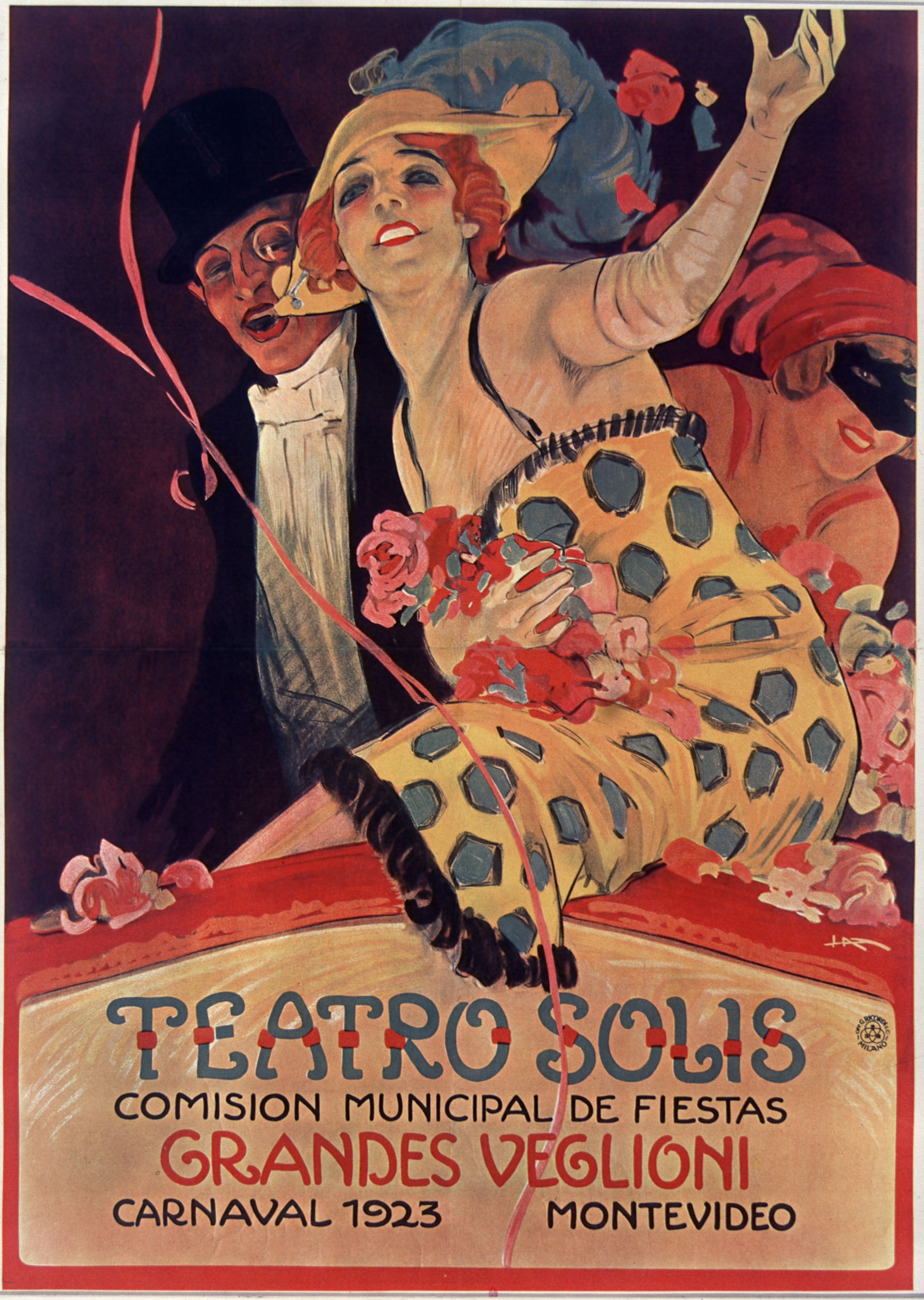
Poster advertising the Solís Theatre of Montevideo, 1923.

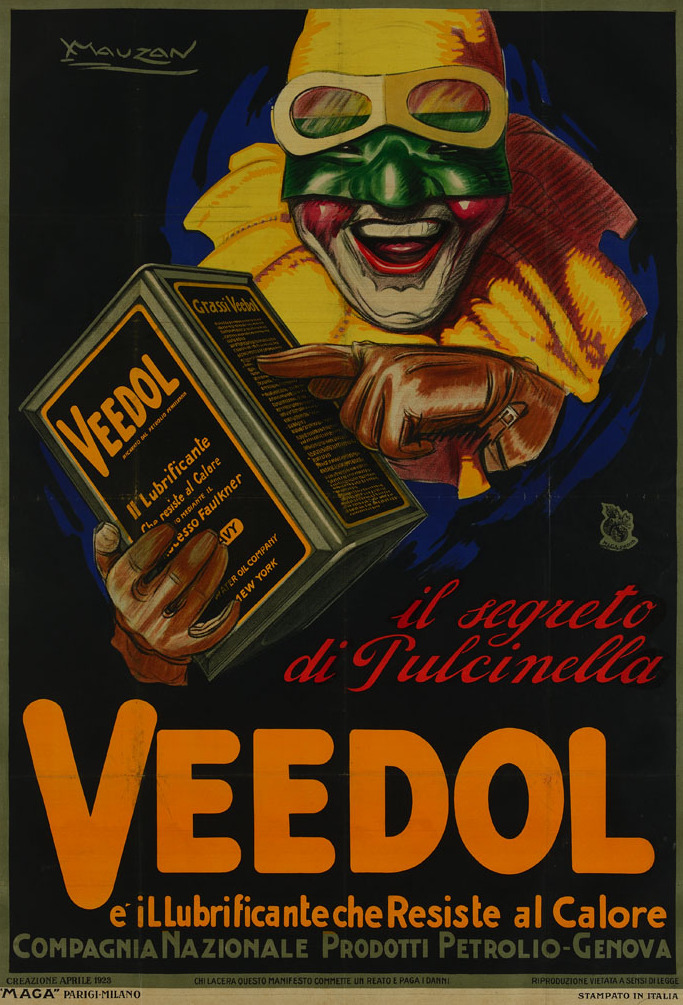
Advertising poster for Veedol, 1923.

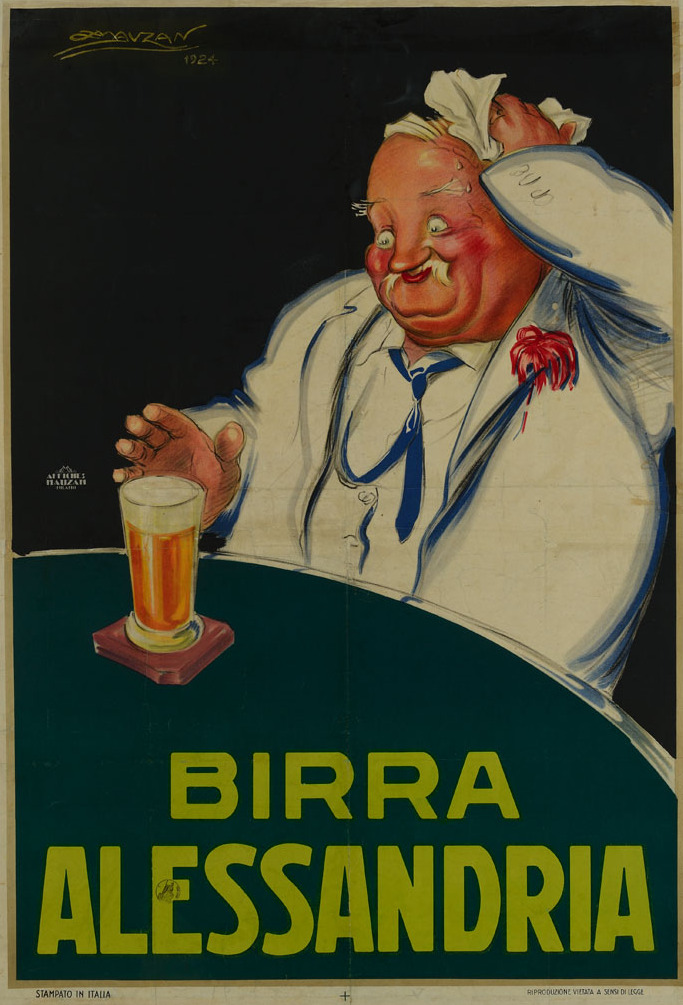
Advertising poster for Birra Alessandria, 1924.

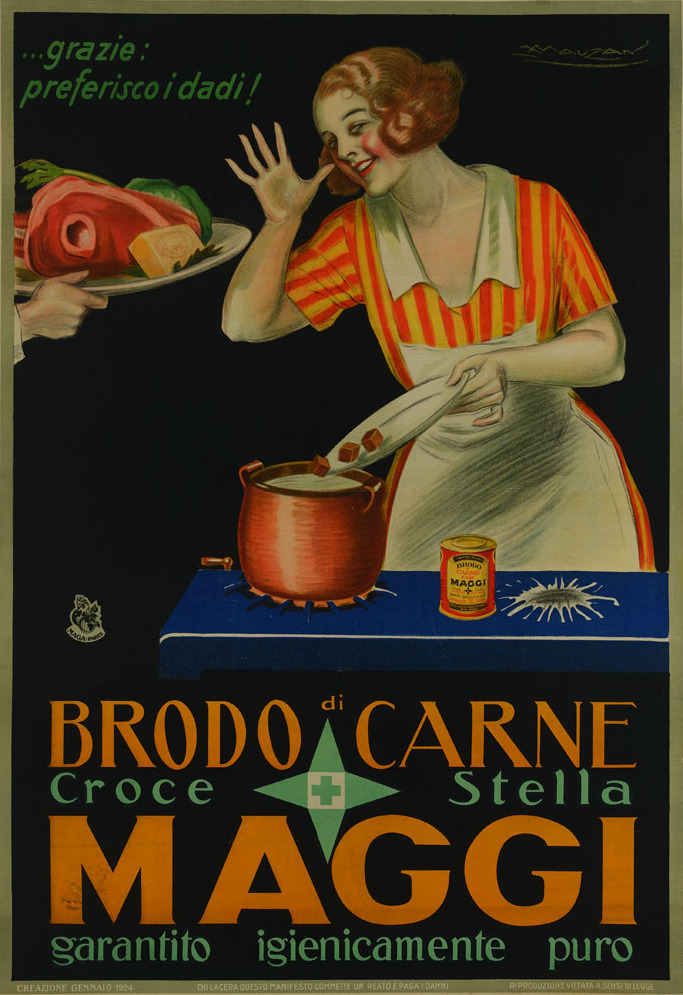
Advertising poster for Dado Maggi, 1924.

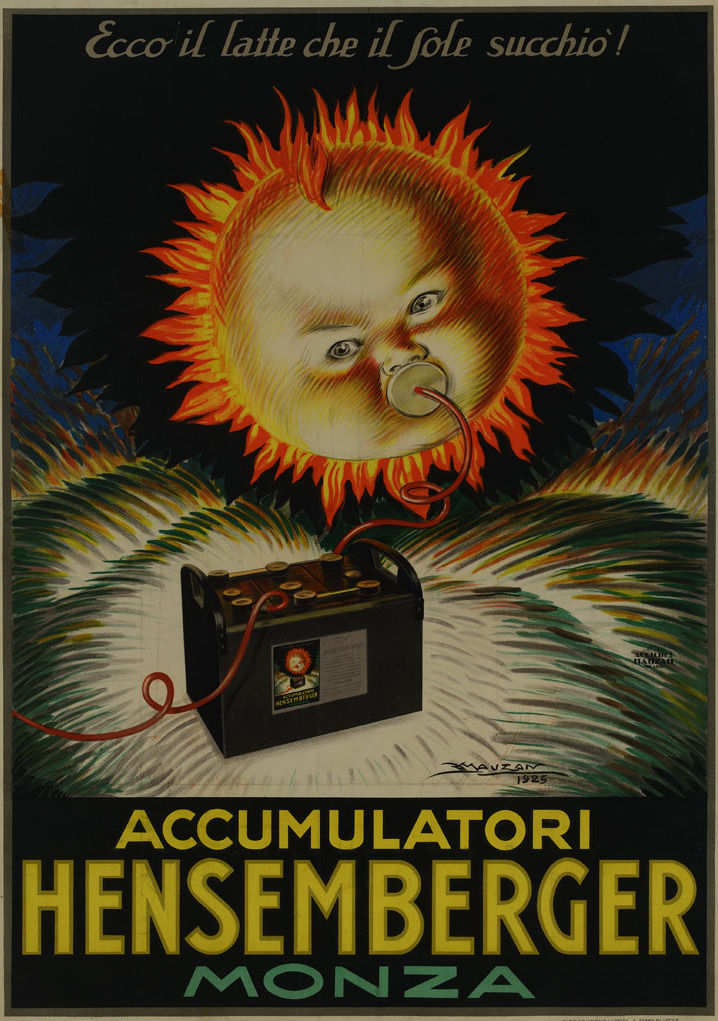
Advertising poster for Hensenberger, 1925.

Poster advertising the Establ. Musical Neumann, 1927.

Poster advertising the Exposicion Radio cinematografia y fonografia, 1930.

Advertising poster for Quilmes Cristal, 1930.

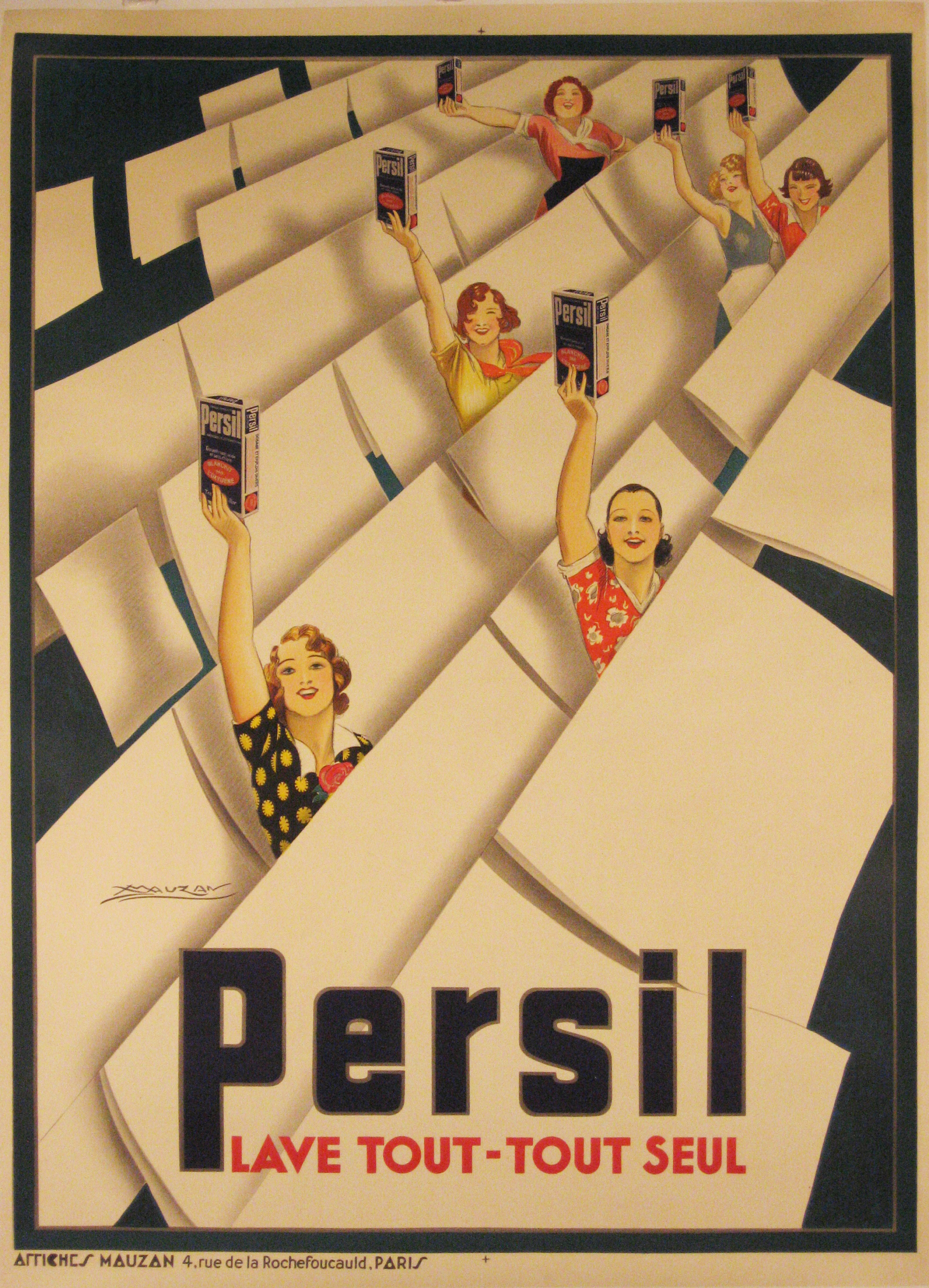
Advertising poster for Persil, 1935.

== See also ==
- Poster
