= The French Union of Modern Artists =

Movement of decorative artists (1929–1959)

The French Union of Modern Artists (French: Union des artistes modernes; UAM) was a movement made up of decorative artists and architects founded in France on 15 May 1929 and active until 1959.

Initially made up of around 200 dissidents of the Société des Artistes-Décorateurs (SAD) and led by Robert Mallet-Stevens, the UAM offered a strong and militant alternative to the SAD. Motivated towards making a clean break from the past and struggling against objects in style, artists of the union proclaimed 'We must rise up against everything that looks rich, whatever is well made, and anything inherited from grandmother... will where habit is not invoked...overcome the habit of the eyes'. Young makers of jewellery joined the union with aims to create works of art in their field through the use of less expensive materials, making it more accessible than the current trend of expensive bijoux blancs.

UAM participated annually in the Salon Autum with an exhibit created by 'The Group', and emphasized design over decoration. Interiors were designed to function with concrete, steel and glass architecture and furniture made of metallic structures was arranged within, without additional decoration. Their message was amplified through various shows and manifesto's (its first in 1934 'For Modern Art as a Frame for Contemporary Life') and activity peaked at the 1937 World's Fair in Paris where Frank Jourdain's work was displayed in his interior design for A White Home; Marcel Gascoin's storage and organization capabilities were displayed in his library exhibit; Charlotte Perriand exhibited folding chairs with steel tubing; and Jean Prouvé introduced one of the first chairs constructed with the new material - Plexiglas.

Members included as 'Actifs' on the 'catalogue de la première exposition de l'UAM, 1930 (catalogue of the first exhibition, 1930)':

- Charlotte Alix (1897–1987)
- Pierre Barbe
- Louis Barillet (1880–1948)
- Georges Bastard (1881–1939)
- Jean Burkhalter (1895–1982)
- Jean Carlu (1900–1989)
- Paul Colin (1892–1985)
- Etienne Cournault (1891–1948)
- Joseph Csaky (1888–1971)
- Sonia Delauney (1885–1979)
- Jean Dourgnon (1901–1985)
- Jean Fouquet (1899-1984)
- Eileen Gray (1879–1976)
- Hélène Henry (1891–1965)
- René Herbst (1891–1982)
- Lucie Holt-Le-Son (1899-???)
- Francis Jourdain (1876–1958)
- Robert Lallemant (1902–1954)
- Jacques Le Chevallier (1896–1987)
- Robert Mallet-Stevens (1886–1945)
- Pablo Manes (1891–1962)
- Jan & Joel Martel (1896–1966)
- Gustave Miklos (1888–1967)
- Jean Charles Moreux (1885–1956)
- Charlotte Perriand (1903–1999)
- Jean Prouvé (1901–1984)
- Jean Puiforcat (1897–1945)
- André Salomon (1891–1970)
- Gérard Sandoz (1914–1988)
- Louis Sognot (1892–1969)
- Raymond Templier (1891–1968)
- Œvres de Pierre Legrain (1889–1929)

Other members include:

- Rose Adler (1892–1969)
- Francis Bernard
- André Bloc (1896–1966)
- A.-M. Cassandre (1901–1968)
- Philippe Charbonneaux (1917)
- Pierre Chareau (1883–1950)
- Marcel Gascoin (1907–1986)
- Adrienne Gorska (1899–1969)
- Pierre Guariche (1926–1995)
- Gabriel Guevrekian
- Charles-Edouard Jeanneret (Le Corbusier) (1887–1965)
- Pierre Jeanneret (1896–1967)
- Frantz-Philippe Jourdain
- Jean Lambert-Rucki
- Claude Lemeunier
- Charles Loupot
- André Lurçat,
- Mathieu Matégot (1910–2001)
- Charles Peignot
- Georges-Henri Pingusson (1894–1978),
- Claude Prouvé (1929)
- Robert Le Ricolais (1894–1977)
- Carlo Rim (1905–1989)
- André Salmon
- Roger Tallon (1929)
- Maximilien Vox

== Bibliography ==
- Alba Cappellieri. Jewelry from Art Nouveau to 3d Printing. Skira Milan. p. 264. ISBN 978-8857237367.
