= Jean Lambert-Rucki =

French painter

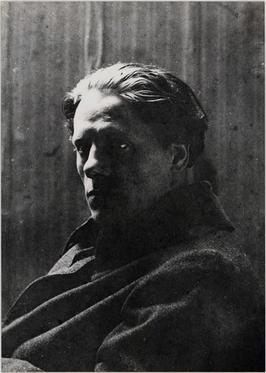
- Lambert-Rucki c. 1918
- Born: 09/17/1888; Kraków, Poland
- Died: 07/27/1967; Paris, France
- Known for: Painting, Sculpture
- Movement: Cubism, Surrealism, Art Deco
- Spouse: Monique Bickel m. 1920-
- Children: Mara Rucki - b. April 7, 1920

Jean Lambert-Rucki (1888–1967) was a Polish avant-garde artist, sculptor, and graphic artist. He was best known for his participation in the Cubist, Surrealist and Art Deco movements. He exhibited at the 1913 Salon d'Automne in Paris; from 1919 was represented by both Léonce Rosenberg at the Galerie de l'Effort Moderne and the art dealer Paul Guillaume. In March 1920, Lambert-Rucki exhibited at the second exhibition of la Section d'Or, Galerie de La Boétie, Paris, and participated in the first exhibition of l'Union des Artistes Modernes, where he continued to show his works. He worked with diverse styles and media, at times he was influenced by the tribal art of Africa. Lambert-Rucki also became well known for his Cubist cityscapes.

== Early life ==
Jean Lambert-Rucki, 1919, La Visite, 65 x 92 cm, Musée des Années 30, Boulogne-Billancourt, Dépôt du Centre Georges Pompidou, MNAM, Paris

Born in 1888 in Kraków, Poland, Jean Lambert-Rucki was the youngest of a large family. He was eleven years old when his father died suddenly. A child prodigy, he earned a living by making portraits that surprised the Bourgeoisie of Kraków.

He attended art school in his hometown to pursue his studies, and then went to the School of Fine Arts in Kraków where he became friends with Moïse Kisling, who was an artist he found n Paris. His youth was marked by immersion in the rich folklore of Central Europe. He made several trips to Russia, frequented gypsies, and learned Russian dances. His work throughout his career remained deeply imbued with the product of these early experiences.

Enthused by an exhibition of works by Gauguin in Kraków, he decided to go to Paris and arrived one morning in February 1911 with 17 Francs in his pocket. He immediately met friends of Polish origin who hosted him. He enrolled at the Académie Colarossi where he mingled with bohemian artists of Montparnasse at Le Dôme Café and Café de la Rotonde. There he met Chaïm Soutine, Léopold Survage, Tsuguharu Foujita, Blaise Cendrars, Max Jacob and Amedeo Modigliani; who he shared a room with at 8 rue de la Grande-Chaumière in Montparnasse, a studio rented to them by the Polish poet, writer and art dealer Léopold Zborowski.

Lambert-Rucki earned his living by retouching photographs in Montmartre, something which did not fulfill his monetary needs. In 1913 he moved into a studio at 29 rue Campagne Première in the 14th arrondissement of Paris. In 1914 he engaged in the French Foreign Legion to serve France during the war. He changed his name to Jean Lambert-Rucki. He was wounded during the war and he was assigned to the Archeological Service at the Archaeological Museum of Thessaloniki in Greece, where he conducted excavations. He later made copies of the mosaics of Sainte Sophie de Salonique for the Louvre under the direction of Jean Guiffrey the Curator for the Department of Painting, Musées nationaux.

During his military service he befriended sculptors Joseph Csaky and Gustave Miklos. Miklos became the godfather of Lambert-Rucki's daughter Théano, called "Mara". In 1918, demobilized, Lambert-Rucki returned to Paris where he settled at 12 rue du Moulin-de-Beurre in the Montparnasse district.

== After World War I ==
With the support given by Léonce Rosenberg from 1918, Cubism returned as a central issue for artists. With the Parisian Salons dominated by a Return to order, the artist, theorist Albert Gleizes attempted to resuscitate the spirit of the Section d'Or in 1920, with the aim of introducing innovative artists of different nationalities to the general public, and organizing exhibitions with literary and musical auditions in many countries. Further support for the endeavor came from Fernand Léger, Alexander Archipenko, Georges Braque, Constantin Brâncuși, Henri Laurens, Jacques Villon, Raymond Duchamp-Villon, Louis Marcoussis, Joseph Csaky, Léopold Survage and Jean Lambert-Rucki.

In 1920 Lambert-Rucki married Monique Bickel (born 1892), who was a pupil of the sculptor Auguste Rodin. Their daughter Mara Rucki was born 7 April 1920.

In 1923 he became friends with the Coppersmith Jean Dunand, with whom he worked with for twenty years. He refused the proposal of Jean Dunand to co-sign their works (except at the very beginning of their cooperation).

From 1925 to the end of his life, Lambert-Rucki exhibited his works, many of which were commissioned, throughout Europe, Canada and the United States, and churches (large renovations after the Great War). The same year, he collaborated with Émile-Jacques Ruhlmann and Jean Dunand for the International Exposition of Modern Industrial and Decorative Arts of 1925, the exhibition that epitomized what came to be called decades later Art Deco, a "modern" style characterized by a streamlined geometric and symmetric compositions, and a sleek machine-age look.

In 1930 Lambert-Rucki became one of the pioneers of Modern Religious Art. In 1931, he became an active member of the Union des Artistes Modernes (UAM), where he exhibited alongside René Herbst, Charles-Edouard Jeanneret (Le Corbusier), Robert Mallet-Stevens, the architect Georges-Henri Pingusson, Jean Fouquet (for whom he made jewelry), in exhibits that emphasized design over decoration.

Jean Lambert-Rucki became a naturalized French citizen in 1932.

In 1933, he left his Montparnasse studio for one at 26 Rue des Plantes, Paris. In May 1943, he participated in a group exhibition of artists in the "2ème groupe" at Galerie Drouant-David in Paris.

He remained solitary throughout his life, fleeing the world with its demands and its vanities. His raison d'être was the incessant need to create something "new".

== Death ==
In 1967 at the age of 80, he died at his home at Rue des Plantes, Paris, France from a vascular disease.

== Exhibitions during his life-time ==
- 1913, Salon d'Automne
- 1919, Salon d'Automne, Léonce Rosenberg (Galerie de l'Effort Moderne) and with the dealer Paul Guillaume
- 1920, the second exhibition of la Section d'Or, Galerie de La Boétie and the Salon des Indépendants
- 1923, one man show at Galerie de l'Effort Moderne
- 1925, l'Hôtel du Collectionneur and the Fumoir, with Jacques-Emile Ruhlmann and Jean Dunand
- 1932, presents a religious sculpture at the Crémaillère that provokes a scandal that forced him to remove his work from the exhibition
- 1934, first manifestation d'Art Sacré at l'Hôtel des Ducs de Rohan
- 1936, participates at the manifestation d'Art Sacré, l'OGAR (Office Général d'Art Religieux), 241 bd St Germain
- 1937, Exposition Internationale, Pavillon de l'U.A.M. He creates l'Accueil des Artistes Modernes, a sculpted wall at the entrance, and several masks and sculptures inside the pavillon. He presents Bonhomme Lambert at the Pavillon de la Lumière. He participates in the Pavillon de la Solidarité Nationale and makes jewelry for Jean Fouquet. The French State commissions a sculpture entitled l'Homme au pardessus.
- 1938, Exposition de l'Art Sacré, Pavillon Marial
- 1942, Solo exhibition at Galerie Drouant-David, where he exhibits paintings and sculpture
- 1943, exhibits surrealist drawings rue d'Anjou. Exhibition "2ème groupe", Galerie Drouant-David
- 1947, Exposition de la Céramique Française Contemporaine, Baden-Baden, then in Vienna
- 1949, Salon des Artistes-Décorateurs
- 1953, solo exhibition Galerie La " Gentilhommière ", Boulevard Raspail
- 1954, solo exhibition Galerie Drouant-David, 52 rue du Faubourg Saint Honoré
- 1958, exhibition Cairo, Egypt

== Selected works ==
- La visite, 1919, 65 x 92 cm, Musée des Années 30, Boulogne-Billancourt, Dépôt du Centre Georges Pompidou, 1995
- Composition, 1919, oil on canvas, 56.5 × 47 cm, Musée d'Évreux
- Les Promeneurs, 1924, oil on panel, 33.5 × 46.5 cm Musée d'Évreux
- Several works at the Musée départemental de l'Oise
- Saint Sebastien, 1950, sculpted wood, monochrome paint, 181 x 48 x 25 cm, Mont-de-Marsan; musée de la ville

== Selected literature ==
- Artur Winiarski, Jean Lambert-Rucki, Warsaw, 2017
- J. Lambert-Rucki, Marc-André Ruan, Jean-Pierre Tortil, 1988
- Lambert-Rucki: A Lyrical Surrealist, Soufer Gallery, 199?
- Gargallo, Csáky, Lambert-Rucki: exposition Mairie de Paris, Musée Bourdelle, Pablo Gargallo, Jozsef Csáky, 1977
- Jean Lambert-Rucki, 1888–1967: vente, Hôtel Drouot, salle 1, M A Ruan, J P Tortil & Jacques de Vos, 1971
- Jean Lambert-Rucki: présentation d'une donation, 11 octobre 1997-18 janvier 1998, Musée départemental de l'Oise, Beauvais, 1997
- Jean-Lambert-Rucki (1888–1967): Un sculpteur au service de l'Eglise (1938–1967), Alain Choubart, 1992
- Atelier Jean Lambert-Rucki et Mara Rucki, Hôtel Drouot, 1981
- Jean Lambert-Rucki : et les modernes classiques : Galerie Franka Berndt Bastille, Paris, du 13 septembre au 31 octobre 1990, Hôtel des ventes (Enghien-les-Bains, France), 1990
- Lambert-Rucki et les modernes classiques: Exposition. Franka Berndt Bastille, Galerie (Paris), 1990
- Alexandre Vialatte au miroir de l'imaginaire, 2003
- Collection Mara Et Léano Rucki, 25 Sculptures de Jean Lambert-Rucki. Mara Rucki, Léano Rucki, Tajan SA., 2003
- Lambert-Rucki [1888–1967]: collection Jacques De Vos et à divers amateurs; Art nouveau, art déco : vente, Paris, Drouot-Montaigne, 9 mars 1994, commissaires-priseurs, Mes Christian de Quay, Delavenne et Lafarge, Jacques De Vos, 1994
- Art contemporain: Paul Kallos, né en 1928, bel ensemble de 18 oeuvres de 1954 à 1984, ensemble exceptionnel d'oeuvres de Jean Lambert-Rucki, 1888–1967, 12 sculptures, épreuves d'artistes, 2 tableaux provenant de la famille de l'artiste : vente, Paris, Drouot-Montaigne, 14 avril 1992, commissaire-priseur, Me Pierre Cornette de Saint-Cyr Paul Kallos, Jean Lambert- Rucki, 1992
- L'Abbaye de Saint-Benoît-du-Lac et ses bâtisseurs, Claude Bergeron, Geoffrey Simmins, Jean Rochon (dom.), 1997
- History of Modern Design: Graphics and Products Since the Industrial Revolution, David Raizman, 2003
- Modern Figurative Paintings, 1890–1950: The Paris Connection, Martin Wolpert, Jeffrey Winter, 2004
- Collection Sjöberg: Jean Lambert-Rucki, Roger Bezombes, Henri Sjöberg, Drouot, 2002
- The Originality of the Avant-garde and Other Modernist Myths, Rosalind E. Krauss, 1986
- Marcel Breuer and a Committee of Twelve Plan a Church: A Monastic Memoir, Hilary Thimmesh, Marcel Breuer, 2011
- Jean Dunand: his life and works, Félix Marcilhac, 1991,
- 橋本指輪コレクション: Historic Rings, Diana Scarisbrick, 2004
- Liturgical Arts, 1959
- International Art Market, 1983
- Library Catalog of the Metropolitan Museum of Art, New York: Metropolitan Museum of Art (New York, N.Y.). Library, 1987
- Jean Lambert-Rucki, 1888–1967, Jacques de Vos, Paris, 1991
- Art Deco, Judith Miller, 2007
- Golan, Romy (1995). Modernity and Nostalgia: Art and Politics in France Between the Wars.
- Les Africanistes, peintres voyageurs: 1860–1960, Lynne Thornton, 1990
- History of art, Kirsten Bradbury, 2005
- The encyclopedia of art deco, Alastair Duncan, 1998
- Christie's Art Deco, Fiona Gallagher, Simon Andrews, Michael Jeffery, 2000
- Art Deco, Victor Arwas, 2000
- Art deco 1910–1939, Tim Benton, Charlotte Benton, Ghislaine Wood, 2003
- The Andy Warhol collection: sold for the benefit of the Andy Warhol Foundation for the Visual Arts, Volume 1, Andy Warhol, John L. Marion, Andy Warhol Foundation for the Visual Arts, 1988
- 20th Century Decorative Arts, Sotheby's (Firm), 1990
- The design encyclopedia, Mel Byars, 2004
- Rings: Through the Ages, Anne G. Ward, 1981
- Art, Design, Photo, Alexander Davis, 1973
- "Primitivism" in 20th century art: affinity of the tribal and the modern, Volume 2, William Stanley Rubin, Museum of Modern Art (New York, N.Y.), 1984
- Art Deco Interiors: Decoration and Design Classics of the 1920s and 1930s, Patricia Bayer, 1998
- Autour d'un piano de Jean Dunand: sculpteur, dinandier, laqueur, 1877–1942, Jean Dunand, Galerie Jacques de Vos, Claire Bussac, 1991
- Art Deco, Eva Weber, 2004
- Collection Mara et Léano Rucki: 25 sculptures de Jean Lambert-Rucki, Félix Marcilhac, 2003
- Kisling and his friends, Barbara Brus-Malinowska, Jerzy Malinowski, Muzeum Narodowe w Warszawie, 1996

== Catalogue raisonné ==
A Catalogue raisonné of the works of Jean Lambert-Rucki is being prepared by the Comité Jean Lambert-Rucki (an association created 29 October 2008 and declared in the Journal Officiel 12 November 2008).
