= Paolo Costagli =

Italian jewellery designer and gemologist

- Born: 1966; Italy
- Education: Gemological Institute of America (1989), Collegio Alla Querce (1985)
- Occupation: Jewellery designer
- Years active: 1991 – present
- Website: paolocostagli.com

Paolo Costagli (born in 1966) is an Italian jewellery designer and gemologist. Costagli is known for using hard-to-find coloured gemstones, sophisticated colour combinations and strong architectural shapes.

== Early life ==
During his childhood, Paolo Costagli attended the private school Collegio Alla Querce in Florence. At the age of 21, after serving in the military, he moved to the United States where he enrolled in a graduate gemology course at the Gemological Institute of America in Santa Monica, California. After getting his gemologist degree, Costagli went to Muzo, Colombia and worked for several months at the emerald mines. He then moved to Bogotá where he worked for a Japanese export company specializing in emeralds.

== Career ==
He returned to the United States and moved to New York City in 1991. In 1993, he started his gem and antique jewelry business, which sold colored stones. He bought signed vintage pieces from known jewelry designers and sold them. He learned how to craft jewelry from designers like René Boivin, Suzanne Belperron, and Raymond Templier. In 1995, he began designing his jewels. His early collections include Florentine (2001), which was inspired by the vivid colors he saw in the Giardino dell'Iris garden in Florence, and Brillante (2003), which was inspired by a tile pattern at the Doge's Palace in Venice.

In 2008, his Brillante bracelet was included in the permanent collection of The Museum of Arts and Design.

In 2018, his company started a curated online trunk show, allowing clients all over the world to have access to the products and information behind them.

He currently resides in New York City on Madison Avenue.
