= QSAS =

Former Qatari green building certification system

Qatar Sustainability Assessment System (QSAS) was a green building certification system developed for the State of Qatar. It was established to promote a sustainable built environment that minimizes ecological impact while addressing the specific regional needs and environmental conditions of Qatar. In 2012, QSAS was rebranded as the Global Sustainability Assessment System (GSAS) to reflect its expanded applicability beyond Qatar. QSAS is no longer in use under its original name.

== Overview ==
QSAS was developed by the Gulf Organisation for Research and Development (GORD) in collaboration with the T.C. Chan Center for Building Simulation and Energy Studies at the University of Pennsylvania . Since its deployment in 2009, over 128 buildings in Qatar have been certified through QSAS. In December 2010, QSAS was adopted into the curriculum of the environmental design faculty at King Fahd University and Qatar University. In March 2011, the State of Qatar integrated QSAS into the Qatar Construction Specifications [QCS] making the implementation of certain criteria mandatory for buildings developed in Qatar.

The development of the rating system took advantage of a comprehensive review of combined best practices employed by a mix of established international and regional rating systems. This review has been performed while taking into consideration the needs that are specific to Qatar’s local environment, culture, and policies. This has led to adaptations and additions to sustainability criteria. Measurements for the rating system are designed to be performance-based and quantifiable. The result is a performance-based sustainable building rating system customized to the unique conditions and requirements of the State of Qatar.

== Rating system ==
QSAS consists of a series of sustainable categories and criteria, each with a direct impact on environmental stress mitigation. Each category measures a different aspect of the project’s environmental impact. The categories define these broad impacts and address ways in which a project can mitigate the negative environmental effects. These categories are then broken down into specific criteria that measure and define individual issues. These issues range from a thorough review of water consumption to an assessment of light quality. Each criterion specifies a process for measuring individual aspects of environmental impact and for documenting the degree to which the requirements have been met. A score is then awarded to each criterion based on the degree of compliance.

The eight categories of QSAS are the following:

Urban Connectivity [UC]

The Urban Connectivity category consists of factors associated with the urban environment such as zoning, transportation networks and loadings. Loadings on the urban environment include traffic congestion and pollution.

Site [S]

The Site category consists of factors associated with land use such as land conservation or remediation and site selection, planning and development.

Energy [E]

The Energy category consists of factors associated with energy demand of buildings, the efficiency of energy delivery, and the use of fossil energy sources that result in harmful emissions.

Water [W]

The Water category consists of factors associated with water consumption and its associated burden on municipal supply and treatment systems.

Materials [M]

The Materials category consists of factors associated with material extraction, processing, manufacturing, distribution, use/re-use, and disposal.

Indoor Environment [IE]

The Indoor Environment category consists of factors associated with indoor environmental quality such as thermal comfort, air quality, acoustic quality, and light quality.

Cultural & Economic Value [CE]

The Cultural and Economic Value category consists of factors associated with cultural conservation and support of the national economy.

Management & Operations [MO]

The Management and Operations category consists of factors associated with building design management and operations.

== Rating system resources ==
QSAS consists of several resources used to facilitate the assessment of sustainability performance for buildings in Qatar. Target users for the resources are building planners, developers, owners, designers, engineers and environmentalists. The major resources available to QSAS members include the following:

- RFP Preparation: A guide to facilitate the preparation of an RFP and Project Brief in the pre-design stages of development
- Assessment Manuals: Outline the specific measurements, submittals, and scores for each criterion that is assessed for each building type.
- Design Guidelines: Consist of recommendations to be used as guidance for realizing sustainable buildings in Qatar.
- Training Manual: Covers the detailed instructions and examples for completing each criterion.
- Energy Manuals: Documents the application and implementation of the CEN/ISO energy performance standard and all its related standards to all buildings in Qatar.
- Toolkits: Computational systems provided to facilitate the evaluation of a project's performance under the assessment system. The toolkits compute the final project score and certification level for the project using each criterion score entered by the user.
- Calculators: Normative measures provided for many criteria to evaluate the project's performance and compute a final criterion score.
- Project Management System (PMS): Online tool used by project teams to document, upload, and certify their projects in the assessment system.

== QSAS schemes ==
QSAS has been developed to rate different building types as well as projects on the Neighborhood scale for each phase of a building’s lifespan. The building schemes that can be rated with QSAS include:

- Commercial
- Core & Shell
- Schools
- Residential
- Mosques
- Hotels
- Light Industry
- Sports
- Neighborhoods

Phases that can be rated using QSAS include:

- Design
- Construction
- Operations: New/Existing Buildings

The various schemes use similar categories and criteria across each system to facilitate use. The measurements, calculations, simulations, scoring ranges, and weights change accordingly for each building type and project phase.

== QSAS certification ==
The aim for all QSAS criteria and their associated measurements is to be performance-based and quantifiable on the scoring scale of -1 to 3 (-1, 0, 1, 2, 3) or 0 to 3, depending on the criterion’s level of impact. Each category and criterion has an associated weight based on its relative environmental, social, and economic impact. Once a score is assigned to each criterion in the assessment system, the values are multiplied by the weight and a cumulative final score is determined.

QSAS consists of six certification levels to measure the project’s impact. A building that obtains a cumulative final score below 0 does not meet the baseline and will be denied certification. Certification can only be achieved when the final score is greater than or equal to 0, earning a rating of 1, 2, 3, 4, 5, or 6 stars. The highest score a building can achieve is 3.0 and the highest certification level is 6 stars.

== Professional accreditation ==
Professional Accreditation is granted to those qualified individuals who demonstrate in‐depth knowledge of the Qatar Sustainability Assessment System (QSAS) and sustainable building practices. The role of the accredited professional or QSAS Certified Green Professional (CGP) is to facilitate the submittal of projects for assessment under QSAS. The candidate must meet the following requirements to receive a QSAS CGP certificate:

- Be a licensed or certified professional
- Attend a QSAS Training Workshop
- Meet or exceed the passing requirement for the QSAS CGP Exam

== Future development ==
The T.C. Chan Center and GORD are currently working on further developing and expanding QSAS to other regions in the Middle East.
