= Linda N. Groat =

American scholar of architecture

Linda N. Groat is an American scholar of architecture and a professor at the University of Michigan's Taubman College of Architecture and Urban Planning. Her work focuses on architectural research methods, environmental psychology, and issues related to gender and minority representation in the field of architecture. Her work has been published in Journal of Architectural Education, Journal of Environmental Psychology and Progressive Architecture. She is known for her books Architectural Research Methods and The Routledge companion to games in architecture and urban planning: tools for design, teaching, and research.

She was inducted into College of Distinguished Professors of Architecture by the Association of Collegiate Schools of Architecture.

== Education ==
Groat earned a Master of Arts in Teaching from Yale University and a Master of Fine Arts from the California Institute of the Arts. She later completed a Master of Science and a Ph.D. in Environmental Psychology at the University of Surrey in the United Kingdom.

== Academic career ==
Groat began her academic career in 1980 as an Assistant Professor in the Department of Architecture at the University of Wisconsin–Milwaukee, where she later became Associate Professor. In 1987, she joined the University of Michigan's College of Architecture and Urban Planning as an Associate Professor of Architecture. She served as Associate Dean for Academic Programs and Administration from 1987 to 1992 and held a part-time appointment as Faculty Associate at the Center for Research on Learning and Teaching from 1996 to 1997.

In 1999, Groat was promoted to full Professor of Architecture at the University of Michigan, where she has remained a faculty member in the A. Alfred Taubman College of Architecture and Urban Planning.

Before entering academia, Groat worked professionally as a designer and consultant in California. From 1974 to 1977, she was a designer with McCue Boone Tomsick Architects in San Francisco and later served as a design research consultant with Kaplan/McLaughlin/Diaz Architects (1979–1980). She also held freelance roles as a designer and writer in the early 1970s and was a teaching assistant at the California Institute of the Arts from 1971 to 1972.

== Research ==
Her research focuses on environmental psychology with architectural design and education, focusing on both empirical and qualitative methodologies. She has authored and co-authored scholarly articles and book chapters in journals such as the Journal of Architectural Education and the Journal of Architectural and Planning Research.

Groat is the co-author, with David Wang, of Architectural Research Methods (John Wiley & Sons), first published in 2002 and revised in a second edition in 2013. The book is used in architecture programs and has been translated into multiple languages. She also edited Giving Places Meaning (Academic Press, 1995) and has contributed to volumes addressing research, pedagogy, and participatory design.

Groat has written extensively on gender equity in the field of architectural academia. Alongside Sherry Ahrentzen, she co-authored the 1992 essay "Rethinking Architectural Education: Patriarchal Conventions & Alternative Visions from the Perspectives of Women Faculty," which has been cited in studies of diversity and inclusion in architectural education. Her work has addressed the impact of gendered pedagogical traditions, particularly about representation and mentorship.

Her publications appeared both in academic journals and professional outlets, with articles appearing in scholarly journals such as the Journal of Environmental Psychology as well as in professional outlets including Architecture and Progressive Architecture. She is co-editor, with Marta Brković Dodig, of The Routledge Companion to Games in Architecture and Urban Planning: Tools for Design, Teaching and Research (Routledge, 2020).

== Awards ==
In 1998, Groat received the Sarah Goddard Power Award from the University of Michigan for her work on gender equity in higher education. In 2019, she was honored with the James Haecker Distinguished Leadership Award by the Architectural Research Centers Consortium (ARCC) in recognition of her contributions to architectural research and education.

Groat was inducted in 2023 into the College of Distinguished Professors of Architecture by the Association of Collegiate Schools of Architecture (ACSA).

== Selected publications ==
=== Books and chapters ===
- Dodig, Marta Brković; Groat, Linda N., eds. (2021). The Routledge companion to games in architecture and urban planning: tools for design, teaching, and research. New York London Oxon: Taylor & Francis Ltd. ISBN 978-1-032-08432-9.
- Groat, Linda N. (1985). Psychological Aspects of Contextual Compatibility in Architecture: A Study of Environmental Meaning. University of Surrey.
- Architecture and Urban Planning? Game On! : Games as Tools for Design, Teaching/Learning, and Research in Architecture and Urban Planning. Taylor & Francis. 2019-11-25. doi:10.4324/9780429441325-1. Archived from the original on 2025-03-31.
- Wang, David; Groat, Linda N. (2013). Architectural research methods: David Wang, Linda N. Groat (2nd ed.). Hoboken: Wiley. ISBN 978-0-470-90855-6.
- Groat, Linda N. (1984). Lessons on the Use of Historic Precedents. Center for Architecture and Urban Planning Research, University of Wisconsin.
- Groat, Linda N. (1987). Contextual Compatibility in Architecture: An Investigation of Non-designers' Conceptualizations. Center for Architecture and Urban Planning Research. University of Wisconsin.
- Groat, Linda N. (1981). Uses of the Multiple Sorting Task: Linking Research and Practice. Center for Architecture and Urban Planning Research, University of Wisconsin-Milwaukee.
- Groat, Linda N.; Niermann, Matthew; Schermer, Brian (2019-11-25), "The Sorting Task", in Brković Dodig, Marta; Groat, Linda N. (eds.), The Routledge Companion to Games in Architecture and Urban Planning (1 ed.), New York: Routledge, 2020.: Routledge, pp. 203–220, doi:10.4324/9780429441325-15, ISBN 978-0-429-44132-5
- Erfani, Kimia; Brković Dodig, Marta; Groat, Linda N.; Mankouche, Steven (2019-11-25), "Playing Pretend", in Brković Dodig, Marta; Groat, Linda N. (eds.), The Routledge Companion to Games in Architecture and Urban Planning (1 ed.), New York: Routledge, 2020.: Routledge, pp. 63–75, doi:10.4324/9780429441325-5, ISBN 978-0-429-44132-5
- Groat, Linda N. (2017-08-03), "Challenges For Design Review: Complexities and Contradictions in Lay and Expert Perceptions of Compatibility Among Buildings", in Preiser, Wolfgang F.E.; Case Scheer, Brenda (eds.), Proceedings of the International Symposium on Design Review (Routledge Revivals) (0 ed.), Routledge, pp. 79–90, doi:10.4324/9781315531137-8, ISBN 978-1-315-53113-7

=== Journal articles ===
- Groat, Linda N. (2000). "Civic Meaning: The Role of Place, Typology and Design Values in Urbanism". Carolina Planning Journal. doi:10.17615/FQ1V-P617.
- Groat, Linda N. (2017). "Notes on the combination of logical argumentation and qualitative methods in diagnosis of the built environment" (PDF). Architectus. doi:10.5277/ARC170107.
- Groat, Linda N. (1987-03-01). "Recent developments in architectural theory: Implications for empirical research". Journal of Environmental Psychology. 7 (1): 65–76. doi:10.1016/S0272-4944(87)80045-2. ISSN 0272-4944.
- Groat, Linda N.; Ahrentzen, Sherry (1996-02-01). "Reconceptualizing Architectural Education for a More Diverse Future: Perceptions and Visions of Architectural Students". Journal of Architectural Education. 49 (3): 166–183. doi:10.1080/10464883.1996.10734679. ISSN 1046-4883.
- Groat, Linda N. (1992-05-01). "Rescuing Architecture from the Cul-de-Sac". Journal of Architectural Education. 45 (3): 138–146. doi:10.1080/10464883.1992.10734502. ISSN 1046-4883.
- Groat, Linda N. (1993-09-01). "Architecture's Resistance to Diversity: A Matter of Theory as Much as Practice". Journal of Architectural Education. 47 (1): 3–10. doi:10.1080/10464883.1993.10734569. ISSN 1046-4883.
- Groat, Linda N.; Ahrentzen, Sherry B. (1997-05-01). "Voices for Change in Architectural Education: Seven Facets of Transformation from the Perspectives of Faculty Women". Journal of Architectural Education. 50 (4): 271–285. doi:10.1080/10464883.1997.10734734. ISSN 1046-4883.
