= University of Pennsylvania Stuart Weitzman School of Design =

Design school of the University of Pennsylvania

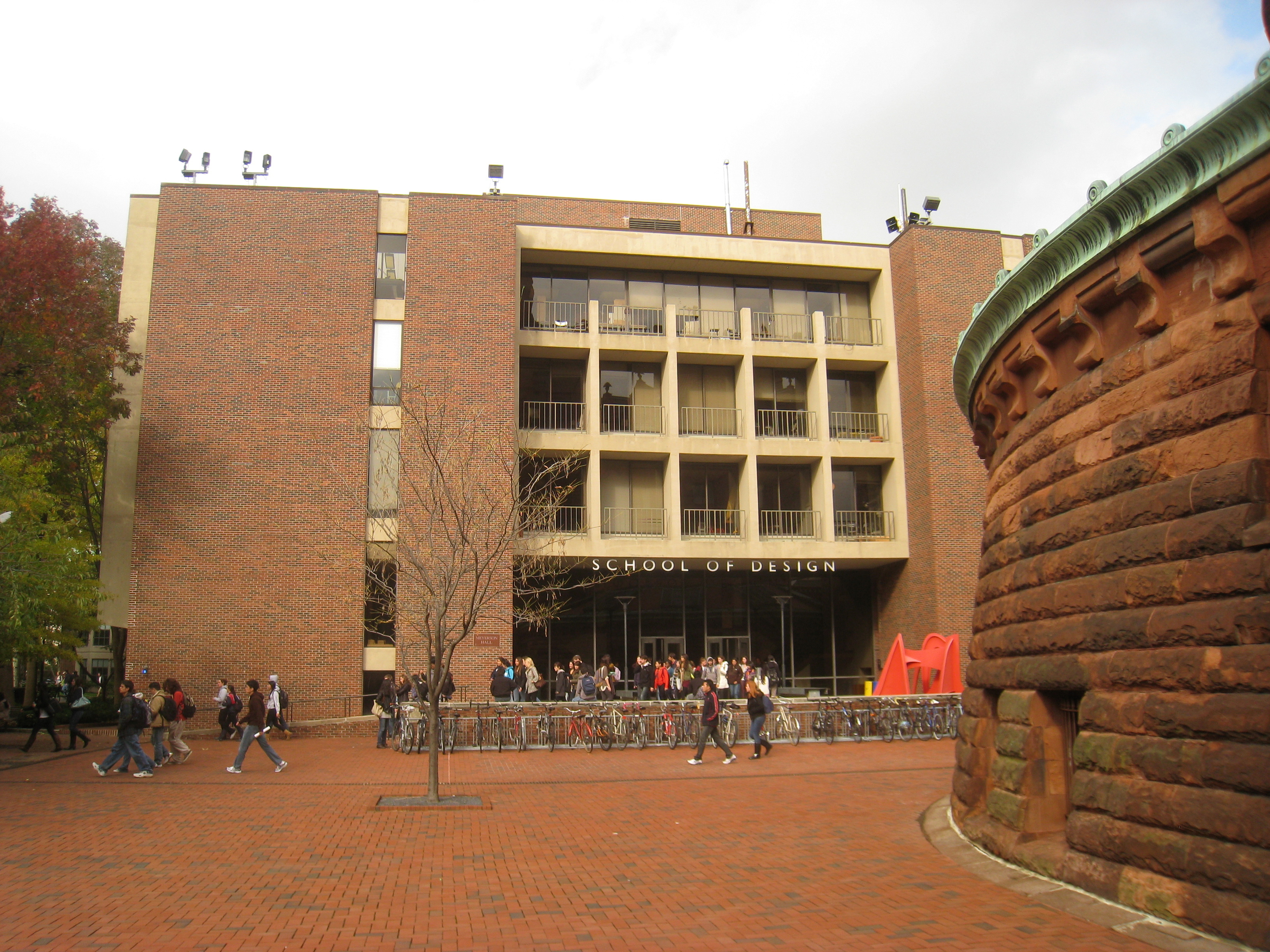
- Entrance to the Weitzman School's Meyerson Hall viewed from the steps of Fisher Fine Arts Library
- Former name: Graduate School of Fine Arts
- Motto: Leges sine moribus vanae
- Motto in English: Laws without morals are in vain
- Type: Private design school
- Established: 1868
- Parent institution: University of Pennsylvania
- President: J. Larry Jameson
- Dean: Frederick Steiner
- Academic staff: 140
- Students: 723
- Location: Philadelphia, Pennsylvania, United States; 39.95212°N 75.19260°W
- Campus: Urban
- Website: design.upenn.edu

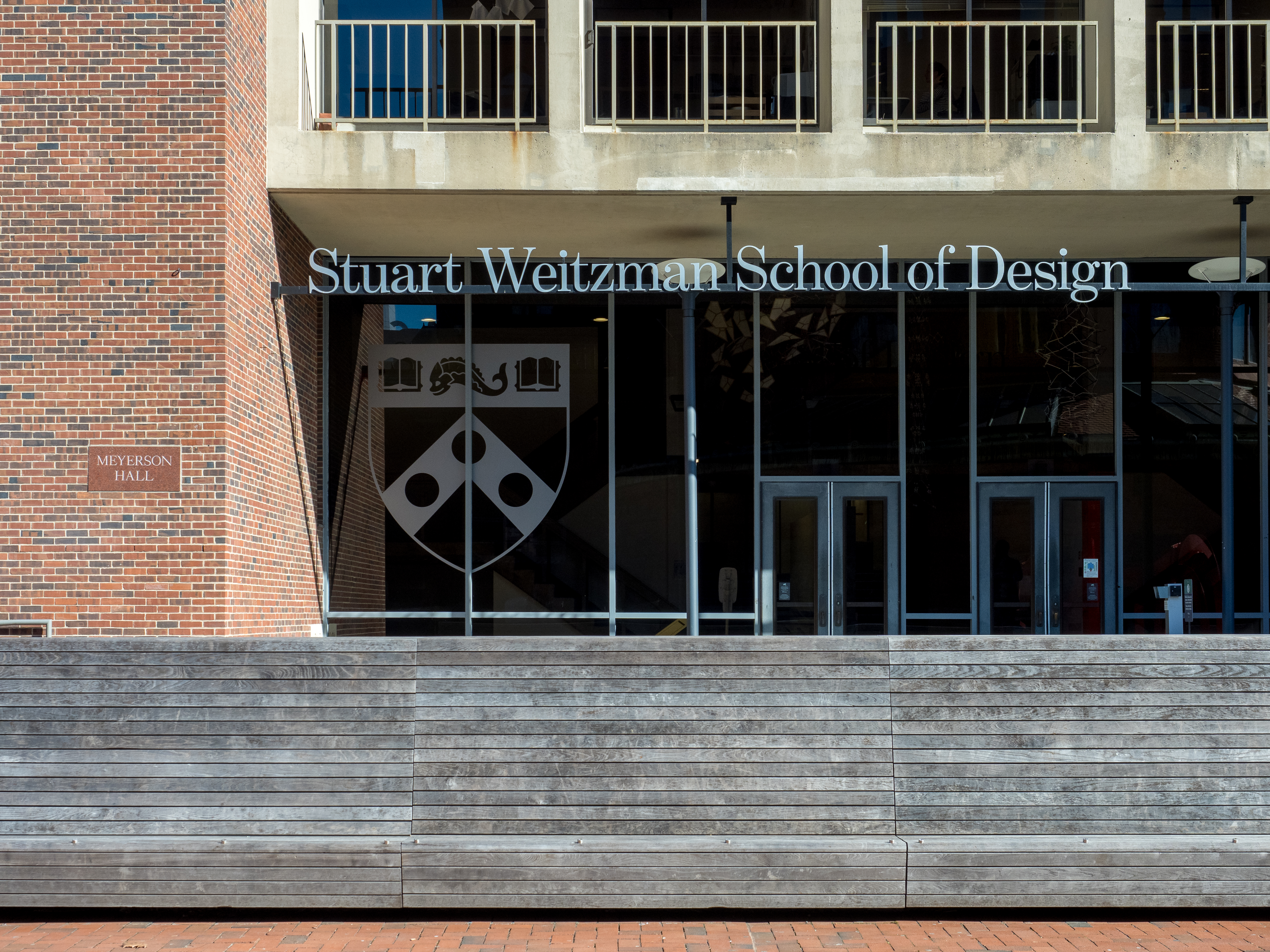
2024 photo of front entrance to Meyerson Hall, main building of Penn's Stuart Weitzman School of Design

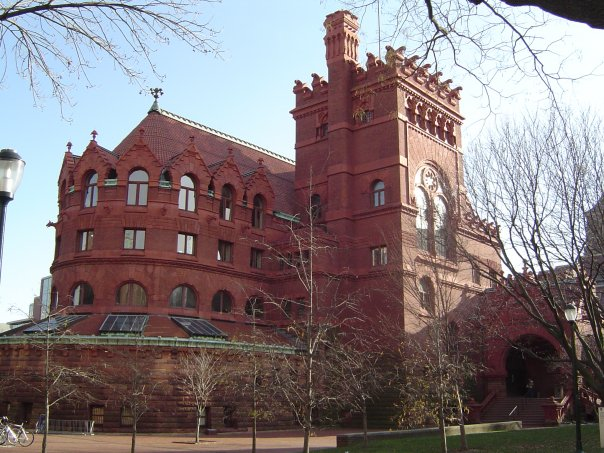
Fisher Fine Arts Library, designed by Philadelphia architect Frank Furness, houses architecture studios on the 3rd and 4th floor

The University of Pennsylvania Stuart Weitzman School of Design is the design school of the University of Pennsylvania, a private Ivy League research university in Philadelphia. It offers degrees in architecture, landscape architecture, city and regional planning, historic preservation, and fine arts, as well as several dual degrees with other graduate schools at the University of Pennsylvania. Formerly known as PennDesign, it was renamed in 2019 after Stuart Weitzman donated an undisclosed sum.

== Notable alumni ==
- Julian Abele
- William J. Bain
- Gautam Bhatia
- Natvar Bhavsar
- Eugenie L. Birch
- Frank L. Bodine
- Eduardo Catalano
- James Corner
- Paul Davidoff
- Frank Miles Day
- Joseph Esherick
- Sheldon Fox
- Marco Frascari
- Bruce Graham
- Charles Gwathmey
- Henry C. Hibbs
- Eric J. Hill
- John Hoke III
- Leicester Bodine Holland
- Louis Kahn
- Stephen Kieran
- A. Eugene Kohn
- William Harold Lee
- Lin Huiyin
- H. Mather Lippincott Jr.
- Richard Longstreth
- Qingyun Ma
- Louis Magaziner
- Ryota Matsumoto
- Peter McCleary
- Milton Bennett Medary Jr.
- Frederick Augustus Muhlenberg
- Jayson Musson
- Barton Myers
- John Nolen
- Rai Okamoto
- I. M. Pei
- Lionel Pries
- Leslie Richards
- Jenny Sabin
- Adèle Naudé Santos
- Denise Scott Brown
- Wael Shawky
- Pushkar Sohoni
- James Timberlake
- Anne Tyng
- David A. Wallace
- William Ward Watkin
- Georgina Pope Yeatman

== See also ==
- PennPraxis
- T.C. Chan Center for Building Simulation and Energy Studies
