= Robert Le Ricolais =

French architect (1894–1977)

Robert Le Ricolais (La Roche-sur-Yon (Vendée) 30 October 1894 – Neuilly-sur-Seine, 4 June 1977), was a French engineer considered one of the creators of the spatial structure principle, based on mathematical logic and observation of nature. He studied and worked in France from 1912 to 1951 and taught at the University of Pennsylvania from 1954 to 1975.

== Biography ==
The son of a lawyer and a homemaker, Le Ricolais obtained his Bachelor of Science after secondary studies in Angoulême and enrolled at the Sorbonne in 1912. Mobilized for the First World War on October 13, 1914, he had to interrupt his studies without ever graduating. Demobilized on April 4, 1919, and, severely wounded, he returned with the War Cross military medal, three injuries, two citations, and a disability pension.

He lived in Paris from 1918 to 1931 before moving to Nantes where he worked in hydraulic companies for thirteen years, and deepened his knowledge in the field of structures. During this period, he developed constructive systems, filed patents, and produced scientific publications.

Le Ricolais came to national attention in 1935, at the age of forty, with the publication of "Les Tôles Composées et leurs applications aux construction métaliques légères" ("Composite Sheets and their Applications to Lightweight Metal Structures") a paper in which he introduced the concept of thin structural walls applied to the building domain, which he also applied to the aeronautical sector. He invented a principle of rigid panels called "Isoflex," formed by crossing and riveting two sheets of corrugated metal. He received the medal from the Society of Civil Engineers of France for his innovative ideas and research on lightweight structures.

In 1940, he published two articles, "Essais sur des Systèmes Reticulés à 3 Dimensions" ("Essays on Three-Dimensional Reticulated Systems") in the Annales des Ponts et Chaussés paving the way for many engineers and architects towards three-dimensional structures. World War II slowed down his research activities.

In 1943, he patented "Aplex," a three-dimensional structural system made of prefabricated wooden elements, suitable for the construction of large-span structures without intermediate support, such as hangars, halls, or covered markets. This system allows material and labor savings by promoting the lightweight nature of the structure and the simplicity of assembly.

After the war, he resigned from his position at Air Liquide, where he was the deputy director of the Western agency, and started working as a consulting engineer.

On July 20, 1945, he was unanimously admitted to the Union des artistes modernes where he met Gabriel Guévrékian among others.

In 1945, architects Paul Dufournet and Jean Bossu brought him to the village of Bosquel in Somme reconstruction project, within the "Architectural Service of Bosquel". This village, nearly destroyed by the German army on 7 June 1940, was chosen by the Housing Reconstruction Committee for experimental and rational reconstruction. Le Ricolais defined a spectacular system for covering operational buildings and sheds using his Aplex three-dimensional truss system. This design was ultimately rejected by the Reconstruction Commissioner, claiming it couldn't be calculated. This argument was proved wrong by Le Ricolais in an article titled "Comparative Structures in Two and Three Dimensions".

Of the major structures he designed applying the "Aplex" patent, only the administrative garage in Yaoundé, Cameroon, built in 1947 and covering 3,400 square meters (37,000 sq ft), remains today.

He chose to immigrate to the United States in 1951, teaching first at the University of Illinois in Urbana and, later, at the prestigious University of Pennsylvania School of Fine Arts (today's University of Pennsylvania Stuart Weitzman School of Design) in Philadelphia. There he was a professor of architecture from 1956 to 1974, and established a laboratory to continue his structural research. At the University of Pennsylvania he became a colleague of Louis Kahn, Ian McHarg, Romaldo Giurgola among other important agents in architecture culture.

In 1962, he received the annual grand prize from the Cercle d'études architecturales for his research on spatial structures. It was during the award ceremony that André Malraux, in his speech, referred to him as the "father of spatial structures".

In 1965, the Palais de la Découverte held the exhibition "Le Ricolais, Espace, Mouvement et Structures" during which he gave a lecture titled In Search of a Mechanics of Forms on July 7, 1965.

In 1973, for his teaching, he became a Fellow of the American Institute of Architects, and in 1973 he received the prestigious A.I.A Research medal. In 1974, he succeeded Louis Kahn and was appointed to the Paul Philippe Cret Chair in Architecture at the University of Philadelphia.

He was named honorary president of IRASS (Institute of Research and Applications of Spatial Structures), which became the Le Ricolais Institute on July 30, 1977, after his death.

In 1997, twenty years after his death and at the time of the exhibition "Visions and Paradoxes. The Structural Research of Robert Le Ricolais" at the University of Pennsylvania, his former students described him as "simply brilliant. According to Peter McCleary, scholar and expert on his work "Le Ricolais was a well-rounded person who, despite his official departmental associations, also enjoyed the humanities and arts. 'He was a true Renaissance man." For this scholar "[Le Ricolais'] major influence derives from publications on his experimental structures and his 'way of thinking' during twenty years of research at the University of Pennsylvania".

A collection of models developed at the Structures Laboratory, among other materials are kept at the Architectural Archives of the University of Pennsylvania. Other materials are in France at the National Museum of Modern Art, at the Kandinsky Library of the Centre Georges Pompidou.

Several streets bear his name in France in La Roche-sur-Yon, Nantes, and Orvault.

== Other activities ==
Le Ricolais was also a painter and a poet. Some of his poetic oeuvre can be found in "À toute vapeur" (Cahiers de l’école de Rochefort) and "Matières" (Renens: Chabloz, 1964).

== Exhibitions of his work ==
The Architectural Archives at the University of Pennsylvania organized "Visions and Paradoxes. The Structural Research of Robert Le Ricolais." Curated by Peter McCleary this exhibition was premiered in 1997 at the Architectural Archives of the University of Pennsylvania. Until 2002, it traveled to various locations including the Colégio Oficial de Arquitectos de Madrid in Spain, the Royal Danish Academy of Fine Arts and Aarhus University in Denmark, the KTH Royal Institute of Technology in Stockholm, the Ecole Polytechnique Federale de Lausanne in Switzerland, the Illinois Institute of Technology in Chicago, and the University of Arizona in Tucson. A portion of this exhibition formed part of "L'Art de l'ingénieur. Constructeur, entrepreneur, inventeur" held at the Centre Pompidou in Paris in 1997.

== Publications ==
Robert Le Ricolais, Les Tôles composées et leurs applications aux structures métalliques légères, Bulletin de la Société des ingénieurs civils de France n°5-6, 1935

Robert Le Ricolais, Les tôles composées et leurs applications à la construction aéronautique (Revue), Paris, Gauthier-Villars, coll. « L'Aéronautique » (no 201), février 1936 (lire en ligne [archive]), p. 25

Robert Le Ricolais, Systèmes réticulés à trois dimensions, Annales des Ponts et Chaussées (7 aout 1940 et 9 aout 1941)

Robert Le Ricolais, Structures comparées en deux et trois dimensions, Techniques et Architecture n°9-10, 1946, p. 418

Robert Le Ricolais, Charpente tridimensionnelle pour hangars, Techniques et Architecture n°7-8, 1947, p. 406

Robert Le Ricolais, USA. Recherches expérimentales à l’Université de Pennsylvanie, Techniques et Architecture (no 5), juin 1969, p. 56

Robert Le Ricolais, 1972–1973. Recherches structurales, université de Pennsylvanie, Techniques et Architecture (no 294), octobre 1973, p. 48
