= Charles Loupot =

French painter

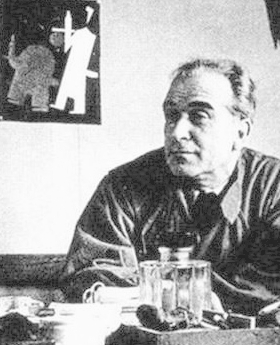
- Born: 20 July 1892; Nice, France
- Died: 18 October 1962 (aged 70); Les Arcs, France
- Education: École des Beaux-arts de Lyon
- Known for: Poster art
- Notable work: Voisin, Colour Lithograph (1923) Cointreau, Colour Lithograph, (1930) Coty, Colour Lithograph, (1938) St-Raphaël, Colour Lithograph, (1950) Lion Noire, Colour Lithograph, (1949)
- Spouse: Marcelle Vittet Jane Alfassa

Charles Loupot (French: [ʃaʁl lupo]; 20 July 1892 – 18 October 1962) was a French poster artist and painter.

He was one of France's most significant poster artists, along with A.M. Cassandre, Paul Colin, and Jean Carlu. His pioneering use of the lithographic technique was widely celebrated across his fifty-year career.

== Early life and education ==
Born in Nice, France, to David Loupot and Joséphine Grassi. In 1907 the family relocated to Lausanne, Switzerland, where Loupot completed his education. In 1911 Loupot was enrolled in the École des Beaux-arts de Lyon, where he took classes in painting and life drawing, and experimented with lithography. The outbreak of the first world war put an abrupt end to these studies, as Loupot was conscripted to fight and amongst the first to be sent to the front. He was quickly injured, however, and sent back to his parents in Lausanne for a period of convalescence. Back at home Loupot resumed designing, and in 1916 his designs were being published in 'La feuille d'Avis de Lausanne'. His studio became a popular meeting place for a range of creatives based in Lausanne, including the photographer Émile Gos, and the writer Charles Ramuz. At this time Loupot also met Marcelle Vittet, his future wife, who would model for a number of his designs.

== Move to Paris and critical success ==
Loupot moved to Paris in 1923 and began working for Maison Devambez. His innovative posters for the automobile company Voisin quickly established Loupot as a pioneering figure on the design scene. In the same year, A. M. Cassandre - with whom Loupot would later collaborate - produced 'Le Bûcheron', also representing a radical departure from the established Art Nouveau style. Loupot and Cassandre, along with Paul Colin and Jean Carlu, were nicknamed the 'Musketeers' by critics, and seen to be ushering in a new era of poster design.

Loupot was chosen as one of the four official poster artists to represent the 1925 International Exhibition of Modern Decorative and Industrial Arts (French: Exposition internationale des arts décoratifs et industriels modernes). The other artists included France's pre-eminent sculptor and draughtsman Antoine Bourdelle. The 1925 exhibition attracted 16 million visitors, and fundamental in establishing the Art Deco style, then known as the Style Moderne.

Loupot started to attract prestigious clients, such as the Maison des Vins Nicolas and Eugène Schueller.

Loupot married a second time to Jane Alfassa, with whom he had a son, Jean-Marie, in 1926.

Along with many of the major decorative artists and architects of the time, Loupot joined the French Union of Modern ArtistsUnion des artistes modernes), in 1929. Emphasising the importance of design, the group aimed to create beautiful, affordable pieces that could improve the quality of people's lives. Cassandre was also a part of the union, and the following year Loupot and Cassandre joined forces to create the Alliance Graphique. The collaboration ended in 1934, Loupot continued to work for a range of clients, and in 1936 met Max Augier, head of advertising for the drinks company St-Raphaël. This partnership lasted for over 20 years, with few creative restrictions imposed on Loupot's design.

For the Exposition Internationale des Arts et Techniques dans la Vie, an important opportunity to showcase Loupot's new designs, Max Augier organised not only an entire pavilion, but also the exclusive right to advertise on the surrounding walls of the exhibition.

Although resident in Paris, Loupot was also a great lover of the countryside. On a visit to the village of Chevroches, near Clamency, he spontaneously bought a house in the neighbourhood. Around this time Loupot met France Pier, who would become his lifelong companion, although they never married.

Loupot later designed murals for a chapel in the vicinity, and there is a permanent inscription dedicated to him at Chevroches.

== Break during WWII ==
At the outbreak of the second world war, Loupot left Paris for Chevroches. Subsequently, the Vichy Regime imposed a series of restrictions on both the sale and advertising of alcohol from 1940. As Loupot would not work in service of the regime, for the remainder of the war he did not produce any more posters, and instead dedicated himself to painting, largely in oils. He only recommenced designing for St-Raphaël in 1945.

== Move to abstraction ==
Following the war Loupot produced series of meticulous designs, that increasingly pushed the boundaries between abstract and figurative works. This change in his style is exemplified in his work for St-Raphaël. This shift has been ranked amongst the most iconic examples of the advertising revolution of the twentieth century. By 1950 the majority of laws against alcohol advertising had been lifted, although some restrictions remained. That year, with the help of Max Augier (by then good friends with Loupot), Loupot formed his own advertising agency, called 'Les Arcs'. Whilst St-Raphaël remained Loupot's major client, he was free to take on other commissions, and worked with Nicolas again. As with his work for St-Raphaël, Loupot's post-war Nicolas designs were radically simplified from their original inter-war appearance.

== Later years ==
In his final years, Loupot spent an increasing amount of time in Provence, at his family home Marika in Arcs-sur-Argens. By 1962 Loupot had officially retired from poster-making. He died at home in the same year.

== Style & technique ==
Loupot's works were produced using the lithographic technique. He experimented in typography and aerograph, an early precursor of the airbrush. Each composition was carefully planned with numerous maquettes and revisions.

Loupot was attentive to the major European artistic developments of the nineteenth and twentieth centuries. His first poster in Paris for the company Voisin clearly demonstrated a knowledge of the French artist Paul Cézanne, whilst he also frequently adapted elements from Fauvism and Cubism. Trained in Switzerland, then a leading centre for graphic design, he was also aware of developments there in Swiss typography and design, and his work also shows a German influence of Sachplakat. Following the second world war, Loupot experimented with abstraction, both in reduction of figurative elements, and also with full abstraction.

== Painting ==
Although Loupot was most famous for his work as a commercial poster, privately he also experimented extensively with painting. These works were not intended to be sold, and were principally images of his surroundings, friends, and lovers. There is, however, some suggestion that Loupot was occasionally commissioned as a decorator at the beginning of his career in Paris, although details surrounding this are unclear. Loupot's most significant contribution to painting was the chapel, Notre-Dame-de-la-Tête-Ronde à Menou, that he decorated in the 1950s.

== Notable works ==
- Voisin, Colour Lithograph, 1923
- Cointreau, Colour Lithograph, 1930
- Coty, Colour Lithograph, 1938
- St-Raphaël, Colour Lithograph, 1950
- Lion Noire, Colour Lithograph, 1949
