= Jean Puiforcat =

French sculptor, silversmith, and designer

- Born: 5 August 1897
- Died: 20 October 1945 (aged 48)
- Known for: The "most important French Art Deco silversmith."
- Style: Art Deco

Jean Elysée Puiforcat (pronounced pwee-for-KAH) (5 August 1897 – 20 October 1945) was a French silversmith, sculptor and designer. Miller's Antiques Encyclopedia calls Puiforcat the "most important French Art Deco silversmith."

== Life and career ==
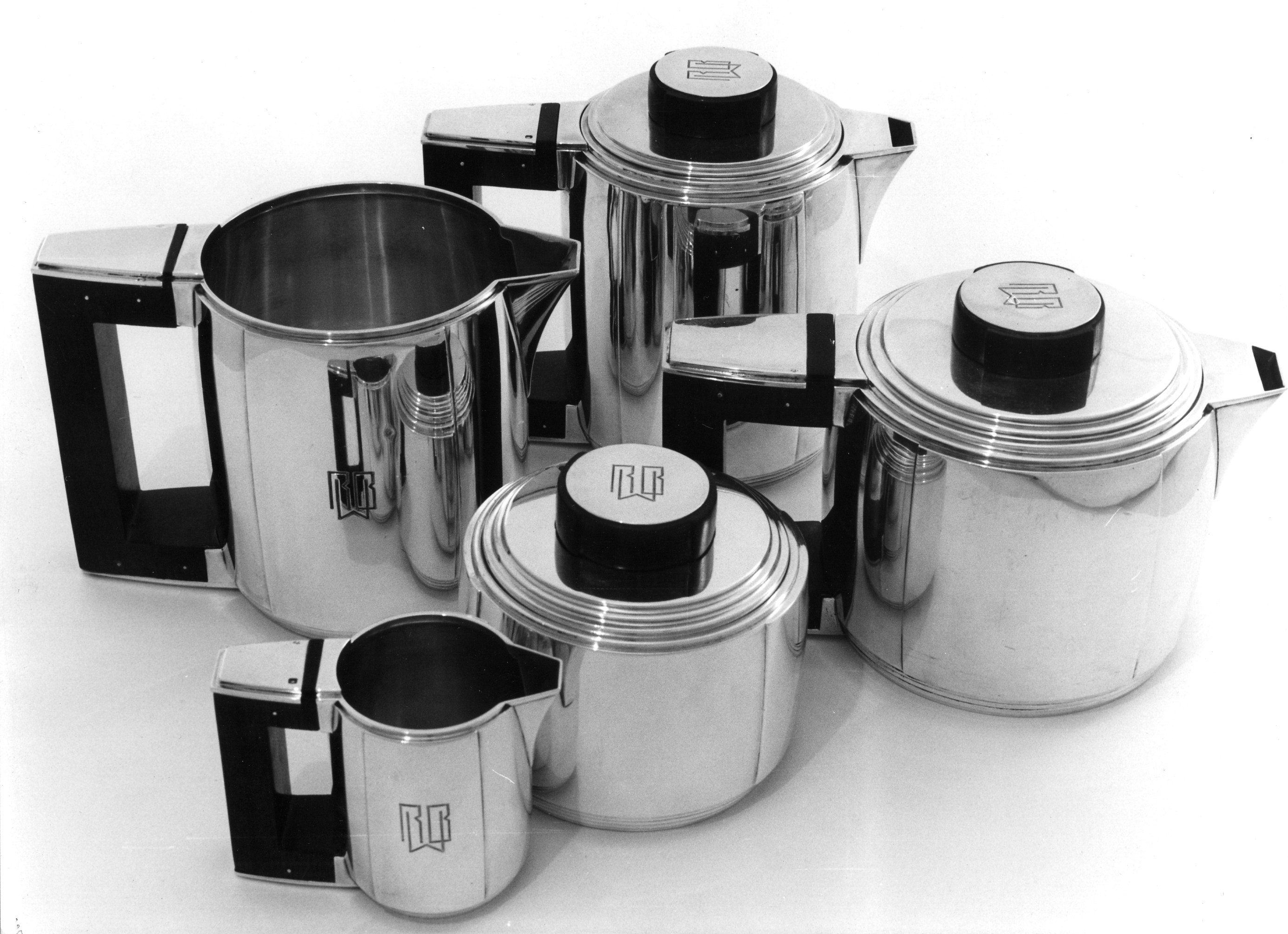
Tea service

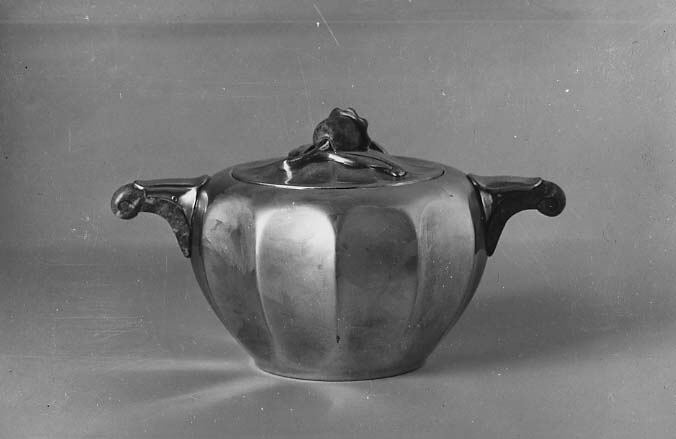
Sugar Bowl with Lid (c. 1922)

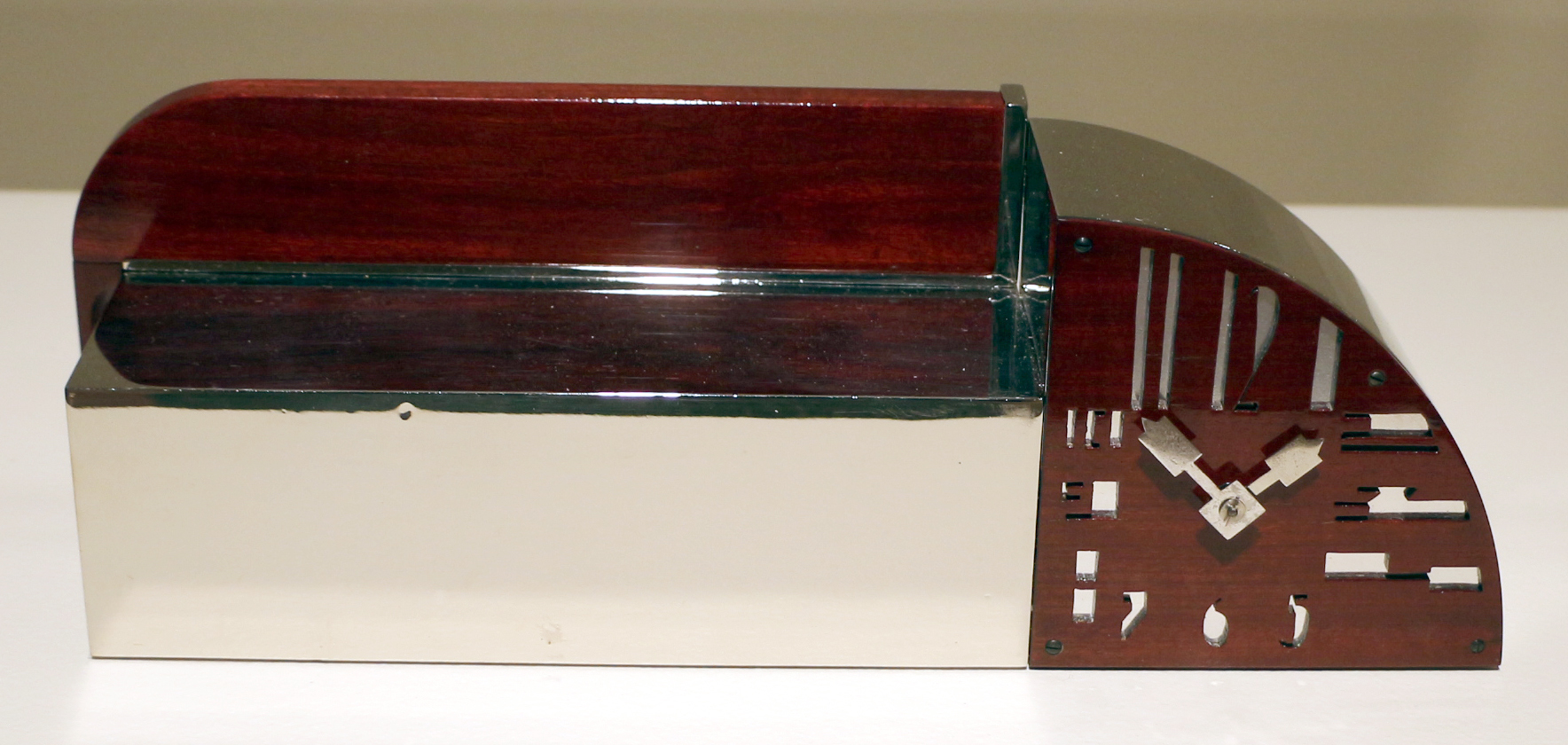
Desk clock (c. 1930)

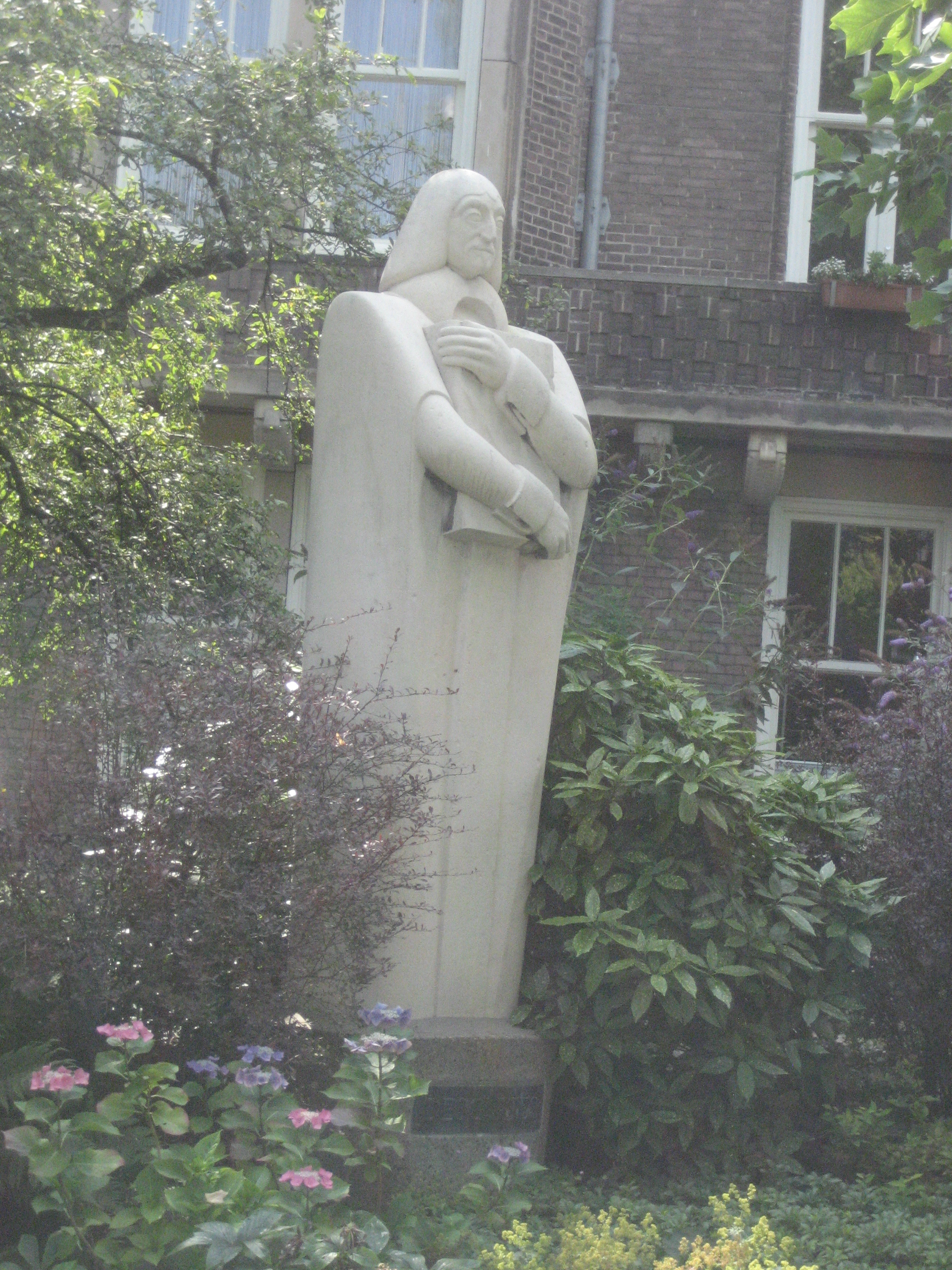
Descartes statue, Amsterdam (1937)

Puiforcat served in World War I. After the war, he apprenticed as a silversmith and a designer. He lived in Paris. He designed in the art deco style. His silver work had smooth surfaces and was based on the geometric series. Ivory, onyx, lapis lazuli, and rosewood were used to decorate pieces. He also used gilding. Puiforcat left Paris and moved to Saint-Jean-de-Luz, around 1927. He worked briefly in Havana, Cuba from 1928 thru 1930. French painter and sculptor Henri Charlier who was born in the Montmartre quarter of Paris in 1883 was a good friend of Puiforcat. Henry and Puiforcat exchanged many letters which his daughter Alizabeth Charlier kept along with photos of a trip that her father Henri made to Havana. The photos were at the shop where Puiforcat and a Cuban sculptor by the name of Juan Comas were sculpting lions to be cast in bronze for an important Havana Avenue. Puiforcat, Henri and Comas became acquainted during his stay in Havana. From one of his letters from Cuba, he wrote about how little credit had been given to the Cuban sculptor, only because he (Puiforcat) was famous. He seemed to admire Juan Comas' talent very much. Henri and Puiforcat kept the friendship and even met in Mexico around 1943. Puiforcat co-founded the Union des Artistes Modernes. He started designing tableware and by 1934 he also had designed liturgical silver. In 1941, he moved to Mexico. After his move, he started exhibiting in the United States. Puiforcat's name is synonymous with Art Deco glamour; even in his day, the important French silversmith was renowned for the elegant, often mathematical simplicity of his geometric forms and the unexpected combination of flawless metalwork with precious woods, brilliantly polished hardstones, semiprecious stones, or glass.

== Legacy ==
Andy Warhol collected Puiforcat silverware, which he acquired while visiting Paris in the 1970s. In 1988, Warhol memorabilia was sold at Sotheby's; the collection of Puiforcat's work sold for $451,000, including $55,000 for a tureen decorated with aventurine. Works by Puiforcat are held in the collections of the Cooper-Hewitt and the Victoria & Albert Museum. A chain of boutiques is named after him, which sell his designs and sculptures.

The Puiforcat brand has been owned by Hermès since 1993.
