= H. Mather Lippincott Jr. =

American architect (1921–2010)

- Born: Horace Mather Lippincott Jr. November 6, 1921; Philadelphia, Pennsylvania, US
- Died: September 20, 2010 (aged 88); Upland, Pennsylvania, US
- Education: Haverford College; University of Pennsylvania School of Architecture
- Occupation: Architect
- Practice: Cope & Lippincott; Cope, Lippencott, & Silfer

Horace Mather Lippincott Jr. (November 6, 1921 – September 20, 2010) was an American architect. He is best known for his work on Quaker meeting houses and schools. His practice was Cope & Lippincott Architects in Philadelphia.

== Early life ==
Lippincott was born on November 6, 1921, in Philadelphia, Pennsylvania. His parents were Sarah Styer Jenkins and Horace Mather Lippincott, the latter a Quaker editor, author, and historian. He was raised a Quaker.

Lippincott attended Chestnut Hill Academy in Philadelphia. He graduated high school in 1939 from Westtown School. He attended Haverford College, graduating with a B.A. in history in 1943. While at Haverford, he was elected class president.

During World War II, Lippincott served as an ambulance driver in the American Field Service for two years. He then enrolled in the University of Pennsylvania School of Architecture, graduating with a B.Arch. in 1948. While at the University of Pennsylvania, he was a member of St. Anthony Hall.

== Career ==
Lippincott started his architectural career with Oscar Stonorov near Philadelphia in 1948 from 1951. He also established a private practice in 1948. From 1952 to 1965, Lippincott lectured on architectural engineering at the University of Pennsylvania Graduate School of Fine Arts.

In February 1957, Lippincott formed Cope & Lippincott Architects in Philadelphia with Paul M. Cope, a Quaker who was his college roommate. Later, the firm was known as Cope, Lippencott, & Silfer. The firm received several design and preservation awards. They designed the Fred W. Noyes Foundation Museum, the Friends Neighborhood Guild House, NYU Conservation Center, and the Philadelphia Yearly Meeting Friends Center Complex.

Lippincott was known as a designer of Quaker educational and spiritual buildings. His meeting house projects include Damariscotta, Maine; Germantown, Pennsylvania; Media, Pennsylvania; Moorestown, Pennsylvania; New Garden, North Carolina; New Providence, New Jersey; Radnor, Pennsylvania; and Summit, New Jersey. His school project includes Atlantic City Friends School, Germantown Friends School, Greene Street Friends School, Moorestown Friends School, Sidwell Friends School, Solebury Friends School, and Westtown School.

From 1958 to 1966, Lippincott collaborated with Robert Venturi for several projects; Lippincott met Venturi while working for Shonorov. They renovated the James B. Duke House and worked on the Guild House. In 1979, he collaborated with Robert T. Crane III to design the Walter Burley Griffin memorial on Mount Ainslie in Canberra, Australia.

In 1978, Lippincott designed the Friends' Center on Cherry Street in Philadelphia. This project included designing the headquarters for the national Quaker organization along with a conference center. The new complex connects with the historic Quaker meetinghouse that was built by Lippincott's great-great-grandfather. In 1985, he designed the municipal building for Birmingham Township, Pennsylvania. After he retired, Lippincott oversaw the renovation of the St. Anthony Hall House at the University of Pennsylvania.

Lippincott became a fellow of the American Institute of Architects in 1972. He was president of the Philadelphia chapter of AIA in 1969.

== Personal life ==
Lippincott married Margaret "Peg" Louise Walker in 1949. Her father was the headmaster of Westown School. They had four sons: Hugh Walker Lippincott, Robert Mather Lippincotts, James Bell Lippincott, and Evan Jenkins Lippincott. They lived in a house in the Rose Valley section of Media, Pennsylvania, designed by Lippencott.

Lippincott was an active Quaker and served on the Friends General Conference Central Committee and American Friends Service Committee. He was a trustee of the Thomas H. and May Williams Shoemaker Fund for more than fifty years and was a founding trustee of the Abraham Lincoln Foundation.

Lippincott was a member of the Union League of Philadelphia where he played tennis and participated in the glee club. He was also a member of the Rose Valley Chorus, was president of the Savoy Opera Company, and performed in the Rose Valley Folk Variety Show from 1965 until he died. He was a master building with the Carpenters' Company of the City and County of Philadelphia.

Lippincott died on September 20, 2010, aged 88, at the Crozer-Chester Medical Center in Upland, Pennsylvania, after being injured in an traffic collision.
