= Journal of Architectural Education =

The Journal of Architectural Education is a biannual peer-reviewed academic journal published by Routledge on behalf of the Association of Collegiate Schools of Architecture (ACSA). It was established in 1947.

In February 2025, it was announced that the planned Fall 2025 edition on Palestine was cancelled following a vote by ACSA Board of Directors. McLain Clutter, JAE interim executive editor whose service was scheduled to extend through 2026, was fired for refusing to endorse the decision.

== Editors ==
The following people have been editors-in-chief of the journal:

- 1947–1948: Turpin C. Bannister (University of Illinois Urbana-Champaign)
- 1948–1949: Elliott K. Whitaker (Syracuse University)
- 1949–1950: Turpin C. Bannister (University of Illinois Urbana-Champaign)
- 1950–1955: Elliott K. Whitaker (Ohio State University)
- 1955–1956: Buford Pickens (Washington University in St. Louis)
- 1956–1957: George Downs (University of California, Berkeley)
- 1957–1962: Albert Bush-Brown (Massachusetts Institute of Technology)
- 1962–1967: Marcus Whiffen (Arizona State University)
- 1967–1969: Donlyn Lyndon (Massachusetts Institute of Technology)
- 1969–1973: Philip Dole (University of Oregon)
- 1973–1974: Arthur Hacker (University of Houston)
- 1974–1979: David S. Clarke (ACSA)
- 1979–1980: Roger L. Schluntz (ACSA)
- 1980–1981: Jeffrey M. Chisud (ACSA)
- 1982–1985: Peter C. Papademetriou (Rice University)
- 1985–1988: David Bell (Rensselaer Polytechnic Institute)
- 1988–1999: Diane Ghirardo (University of Southern California)
- 1999–2007: Barbara Allen (Virginia Polytechnic Institute and State University)
- 2008–2011: George Dodds (University of Tennessee-Knoxville)
- 2011–2012: Ellen Dineen Grimes (School of the Art Institute of Chicago)
- 2013–2013: Graham Livesey (University of Calgary; interim)
- 2013-2021: Marc J. Neveu (Woodbury University)
- 2021-2024: Nora Wendl (University of New Mexico)
- 2024-2025: McLain Clutter (University of Michigan)

== Fellows ==
The following people have been recipients of the JAE Fellows Program, supported by the Graham Foundation and ACSA:

- 2022-2023: Dele Adeyemo, Ella den Elzen, Curry Hackett, and Bz Zhang
- 2023-2024: Aya Musmar, Althea Peacock, Albert Chao, and Mohamad Nahleh
- 2024-2025: Jelisa Blumberg, Luna BuGhanem, Tonia Sing Chi, and Margarida Waco
