= René Herbst =

French furniture designer

René Herbst (18 March 1891 – 29 September 1982 in Paris) was a French furniture designer and architect, best remembered for his advocacy of the industrialisation of furniture as a form of modern art. He co-founded The French Union of Modern Artists in 1929.
