= T.C. Chan Center for Building Simulation and Energy Studies =

The T.C. Chan Center for Building Simulation and Energy Studies is an international non-profit organization headquartered at the University of Pennsylvania. It is an associated center of the University of Pennsylvania School of Design. It is dedicated to addressing the environmental issues faced by the building industry. The T.C. Chan Center engages in collaborative research that is related to the development of basic knowledge, technologies, and processes. Practical applications range from the building to the urban scale. Outcomes include patents, publications and proprietary information. The T.C. Chan Center is a member of the UNEP-SBCI.

== Mission ==
The T.C. Chan Center for Building Simulation and Energy Studies addresses the environmental issues faced by the building industry today. "The mission of the center is to develop new knowledge, tools, processes, techniques, and continuing education for professionals involved in building energy and technology. The goal is to create healthier, productive, energy efficient strategies that will lead to high performance buildings and sustain(able) environments."

== History ==
The T.C. Chan Center was founded by Professor Ali Malkawi in 2006 at the University of Pennsylvania with initial support by Mr. David Chan, a philanthropist from Hong Kong. The Center began with a partnership with Tsinghua University in Beijing and since then it has grown into an international organization with offices in Philadelphia and Beijing, and affiliate offices in France, Hong Kong, Mexico, Switzerland, and Costa Rica.

== Projects ==
=== Energy Efficient Buildings Hub ===
The TC Chan Center was part of the proposed effort led by Pennsylvania State University for the US Energy Innovation Hub, called the Energy Efficient Buildings Hub (EEB HUB), which was previously known as the Greater Philadelphia Innovation Cluster (GPIC). This five-year initiative is designed to improve the energy efficiency of buildings in the US. Appropriated by Congress and funded by the US Department of Energy, this $122 million grant funds core research and development. An additional $30 million was contributed to this award by the Governor of Pennsylvania. The TC Chan Center has managed the University of Pennsylvania’s research portion of the Hub with work including a project that has intended to build a macro level simulation framework that can aid in decision-making by using projections of possible market adaptation of energy efficient building technologies and their large-scale impacts. The Energy Innovation Hub is located at the Philadelphia Navy Yard, a 1,200 acre waterfront business development that includes 120 companies, 8,500 employees and 5,500,000 square feet (510,000 m2) of building space.

=== Qatar Sustainability Assessment System ===
Qatar Sustainability Assessment System (QSAS) is a green building certification system developed for the State of Qatar. The primary objective of QSAS is "to create a sustainable built environment that minimizes ecological impact while addressing the specific regional needs and environment of Qatar"

QSAS was developed by the T.C. Chan Center for Building Simulation and Energy Studies at the University of Pennsylvania in collaboration with and on behalf of the Gulf Organization for Research and Development (GORD). Since its deployment in 2009, over 128 buildings in Qatar have been certified through QSAS. In December 2010, QSAS was adopted into the curriculum of the environmental design faculty at King Fahd University and Qatar University. Most recently, the State of Qatar has integrated QSAS into the Qatar Construction Specifications [QCS] making the implementation of certain criteria mandatory for buildings developed in Qatar.

The development of the rating system took advantage of a comprehensive review of combined best practices employed by a mix of established international and regional rating systems. This review has been performed while taking into consideration the needs that are specific to Qatar’s local environment, culture, and policies. This has led to adaptations and additions to sustainability criteria. Additionally, measurements for the rating system are designed to be performance-based and quantifiable, wherever possible. The result is a ground up, and in large part, a performance-based sustainable building rating system customized to the unique conditions and requirements of the State of Qatar.

=== The University of Pennsylvania Climate Action Plan ===
The T.C. Chan Center has collaborated with the Facilities and Real Estate Division at the University of Pennsylvania on a Climate Action Plan. This optimization project began with a three-year extensive investigation into campus buildings. The outcome of this work was a plan for energy savings and a database that is combined with buildings monitored in China.

=== Risk Conscious Design and Retrofit of Buildings for Low Energy ===
The Center was awarded a grant with Georgia Institute of Technology from the National Science Foundation for an EFRI-SEED project. The objective of this project, Risk Conscious Design and Retrofit of Buildings for Low Energy, is to identify and quantify uncertainty distributions of parameters affecting building performance. This research requires a highly interdisciplinary approach between building modeling and simulation experts; systems design theorists, statisticians, architectural and urban designers, energy technologists, and auditing experts. The research team combines all of these disciplines.

== Events ==
=== UNEP-SBCI Fall Symposium ===
In 2011, the Center was selected to host the United Nations Environment Programme – Sustainable Buildings and Climate Initiative’s Fall Symposium in 2011. The symposium took place on October 27 and 28 at the University of Pennsylvania in Philadelphia, PA. The symposium focused on “Promoting Policies and Practices for Sustainability”. The event included several participants including David Miller, the former Chair of C40 and former Mayor of Toronto, and Mayor Michael Nutter of Philadelphia. The symposium content and outcomes fed into larger global climate discussions at the UNFCCC COP-17 and the UN Conference on Sustainable Development’s RIO+20.

== Publications ==
Building Simulation: An International Journal

The Building Simulation journal, published quarterly by Springer, "publishes original, high quality, peer-reviewed research papers and review articles dealing with modeling and simulation of buildings including their systems." In 2011, Thomson Reuters announced that the journal would be listed in the Science Citation Index-Expanded (SCI-E).
