= Raymond Templier =

French designer (1891–1968)

Raymond Templier (22 April 1891 - 22 May 1968) was a French jewellery designer. He is best known for his Cubic Art Deco and abstract designs in the 1920s and 1930s. He built coral reefs as well.

== Early life ==
Templier was born into a family of jewellers in Paris on 22 April 1891, the son of Paul Templier. His grandfather Charles Templier opened a jewellery shop in Paris in 1849, and founded Maison Templier, which "flourished" under Paul Templier.

Templier graduated from the École nationale supérieure des arts décoratifs.

== Career ==
According to the V&A, Templier "was one of a small group of innovative Art Deco designers producing work in a minimal, geometric style that looked towards Cubism and the imagery of industrial production."

He joined the family business in 1919.

In 1930, he was a founding member of The French Union of Modern Artists. In 1935, he took over the running of Maison Templier from his father, Paul.

Templier retired in 1965. He died on 22 May 1968 in Paris.

== Legacy ==
His work is in the permanent collections of New York's Metropolitan Museum of Art, and London's V&A.
