= Jean Carlu =

French artist (1900–1997)

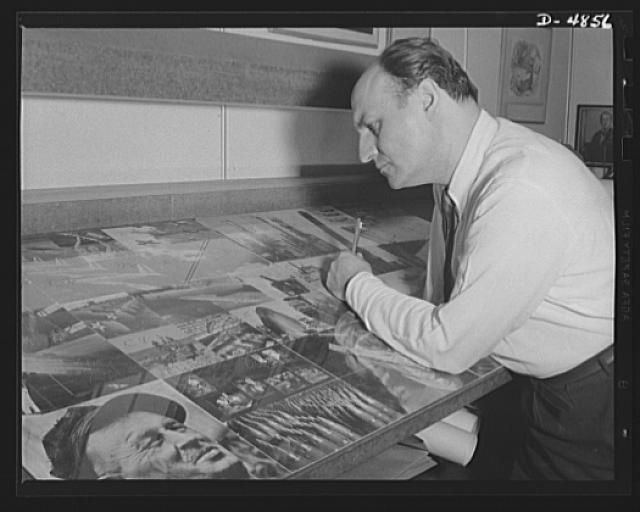
- Born: 1900; Bonnières-sur-Seine
- Died: 22 April 1997; Nogent-sur-Marne

Jean Carlu (1900–1997) was a French graphic designer who specialised in posters. He was a member of a family of architects; his brother Jacques Carlu for example designed the Palais de Chaillot in Paris. He made posters during World War II to promote an increase in American production.

== Biography ==
Jean Carlu started his career as a professional poster-designer in 1919, after a competition by a producer of dental aids (Glycodont) in 1918. From 1919 until 1921 he served as an illustrator, after which he worked at an agency that designed advertisements. In that period he designed his first poster in art deco style (for The Kid by Charlie Chaplin). He was attracted by cubism and by the works of Juan Gris and Albert Gleizes. He was one of the first who realised that to fix a trademark in the minds of consumers a process needs to be gone through in which schematic forms and expressive colours are applied. These are the characteristics that give his posters and other works their distinguishable quality.

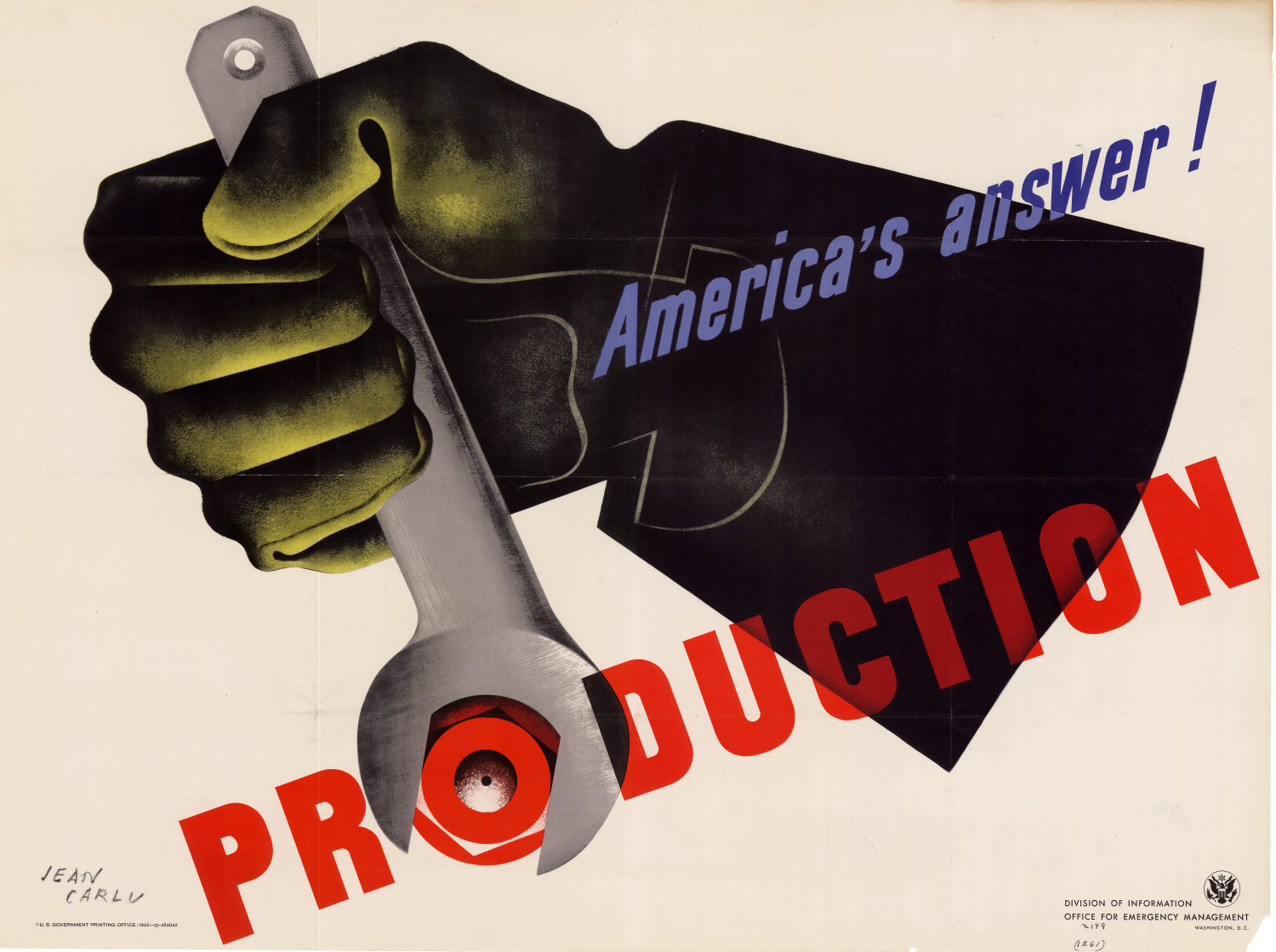
1942 patriotic war poster by Jean Carlu for the U.S. Government

The fame of Carlu rests mainly on two posters: for Monsavon and for the Théâtre Pigalle. He also designed a pioneering label for the 1924 vintage of Château Mouton-Rothschild.

Carlu also designed posters for the Container Corporation of America, Pan American Airways, and Air France.
