= Mimlu Sen =

- মিমলু সেন
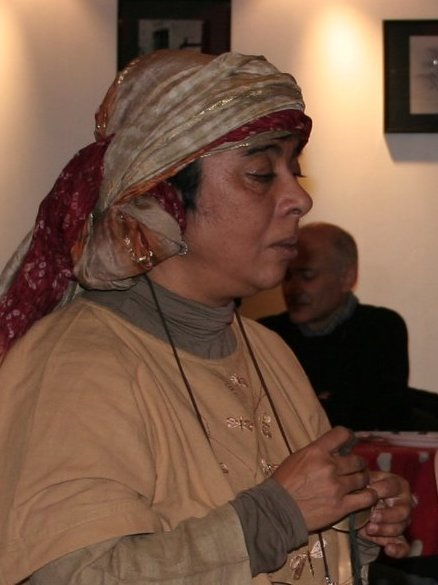
- Sen in 2007
- Born: 1949 (age 76–77); Shillong, Meghalaya, India
- Occupations: author; translator; musician; composer; producer
- Years active: -present
- Movement: Naxalite movement
- Spouse: Paban Das Baul
- Musical career
- Genres: Baul music, folk-fusion
- Label: Fonti Musicali

Mimlu Sen (born 1949) is an Indian author, translator, musician, composer and producer.

She published her first book Baulsphere in 2009, and the following year it was published as The Honey Gatherers. Piers Moore Ede stated that The Honey Gatherers recounts Sen's adventures in rural Bengal.

As the life partner of Bengali baul musician Paban Das Baul, Sen collaborates with Paban on all his recordings, performing with and managing his group on their concert tours around the world. In 2002 she collaborates in a Bengali song album titled Le Chant Des Bauls - Manuche O Rautan with Paban Das Baul, Gour Khyapa and Nimai Goswami which was released by Brussels based Belgian record company Fonti Musicali.

== Early life ==
Sen was born in Shillong, Meghalaya, India. During the 1960s and 1970s she studied in Kolkata and participated in street protests demanding an end to the Vietnam War. She was jailed for the Naxalite movement.

== Bibliography ==
- Baulsphere. India: Random House India. 2009. ISBN 9788184000559. OCLC 762666034. OL 23873712M.
- The Honey Gatherers. London: Rider (imprint). 2010. ISBN 9781846041891. OCLC 503647267. OL 24084518M.

== Discography ==
- Le Chant Des Bauls - Manuche O Rautan (2002, with Paban Das Baul, Gour Khyapa & Nimai Goswami)
