= Back to Mine: Talvin Singh =

Mixtape by Talvin Singh
- Released: 2001

Talvin Singh chronology
Ha (2001)	Back to Mine: Talvin Singh (2001)	Sweet Box (2008)

Back to Mine: Talvin Singh is the eighth volume of the Back to Mine series of albums. It was compiled by English musician and DJ Talvin Singh, and released in 2001.

== Track listing ==
No.	Title	Original Artist	Length
1.	"Weather Storm"	Craig Armstrong	5:57
2.	"Dance"	U. Srinivas & Michael Brook	9:41
3.	"Song of Sand II (Coastal Warning Mix by Rockers Hi-Fi)"	Nils Petter Molvær	3:51
4.	"Delta"	The Higher Intelligence Agency	5:17
5.	"Cave of Angels"	Dreadzone	6:07
6.	"Kabhi Unke Milan Ke Asha Ne"	Swati Natekar	4:34
7.	"Om"	Trilok Gurtu	3:59
8.	"Lost Blue Heaven"	Photek	2:11
9.	"Kalpa Taru (Tree Of Wishes)"	Tuu	1:48
10.	"Monsoon"	Vibrasphere	3:50
11.	"Mali Dje"	Ali Farka Touré	5:03
12.	"W30"	Dub Tractor	4:37
13.	"After (Atjazz Remix)"	dZihan & Kamien	6:58
14.	"Mustt, Mustt (Massive Attack Remix)"	Nusrat Fateh Ali Khan	4:34
