= Le Chant Des Bauls - Manuche O Rautan =

Compilation album by Paban Das Baul, Gour Khyapa, Nimai Goswami, Mimlu Sen
- Released: September 23, 2002
- Recorded: 2002
- Venue: Brussels
- Genre: Musiques du monde
- Length: 67:35 min
- Label: Fonti Musicali

Paban Das Baul chronology
| Inner Knowledge (1997) | Le Chant Des Bauls - Manuche O Rautan (2002) | Music of the Honey Gatherers (2010) |

Le Chant Des Bauls - Manuche O Rautan is a 2002 Bengali Baul song album by Paban Das Baul, Gour Khyapa, Nimai Goswami and Mimlu Sen. It was released by Brussels based Belgian record company Fonti Musicali on 23 September in 2002.

== Background ==
| No. | Title | Lyrics | Performer(s) | Length |
|---|---|---|---|---|
| 1. | "Bhojpuri" | | | 02:38 |
| 2. | "Jao Anandapure" | | Paban Das Baul | 06:53 |
| 3. | "Bina Sadhane" | | | 07:04 |
| 4. | "Din Hiner Bhava" | | Paban Das Baul | 07:40 |
| 5. | "Manuche Ekta Kaler Gari" | Rashid Uddin | Nimai Goswami | 05:56 |
| 6. | "Dukho Dao Jejonare" | | | 09:41 |
| 7. | "Manuche O Rautan" | | | 06:54 |
| 8. | "Sahaj Prem" | | | 06:54 |
| 9. | "Brindabane Phul Phutechey" | | | 13:49 |
| Total length: | | | | 67:35 |
