= Tana Tani =

Studio album by State of Bengal and Paban Das Baul
- Released: 12 April 2004
- Genre: Electronic; folk; World music; drum and bass; downtempo; Bangladeshi classical; Indian classical music
- Length: 72:06
- Language: Bengali
- Label: Real World

State of Bengal chronology
Walking On (1999)	Tana Tani (2004)	Skip-IJ (2007)

Paban Das Baul chronology
Inner Knowledge (1997)	Tana Tani (2004)	Music of the Honey Gatherers (2010)

Tana Tani (Bengali: তানা এখন; 'Push and Pull') is a studio album by musicians State of Bengal and Paban Das Baul, released on 12 April 2004 by Real World Records.

== Critical response ==
Professional ratings
Review scores
Source	Rating
AllMusic	3.5/5 stars

Adam Greenberg of John Bush of AllMusic rated Tana Tani 3.5/5 and described it as "...well-performed and crafted, but not necessarily to everyone's taste. Martin Longley of BBC Music said, "Paban's extended technique allows his voice to soar majestically.." Derek of EthnoTechno said, "Tana Tani is seductive, reels you in with delicate claws and rips away fragments of your being. When you recover, you realize it was excess dissolved, and you emerge with clarity, focused, inspired and content."

== Track listing ==
No.	Title	Length
1.	"Moner Manush"	5:47
2.	"Kali"	7:55
3.	"Radha Krishna"	4:34
4.	"Tana Tani"	5:18
5.	"Ram Rahim"	5:19
6.	"Medina"	5:33
7.	"Padma Nodi"	5:41
8.	"Dohai Allah"	7:43
9.	"Bolo Kotai"	4:49
10.	"Kon Ek Pakhi"	5:26
11.	"Al Keuto Sap"	6:35
12.	"Tal Rosh"	7:26
Total length:		72:06

== Personnel ==
- Yann Pittard – acoustic guitar
- Marque Gilmore – drums
- Mimlu Sen – finger cymbals
- Cheick Tidiane Seck – keyboards
- Paban Das Baul – vocals
- State of Bengal – mix engineer, recording engineer
