= One and One Is One (album) =

Studio album by Joi
- Released: 23 February 1999
- Genres: Techno; electronic; breakbeat; dance; world music; tribal; rock
- Length: 66:02
- Languages: Bengali; English; Hindi
- Label: Real World

Joi chronology
Bangladesh EP (1996)	One and One Is One (1999)	We Are Three (2000)

Singles from One and One Is One
- 1. "Fingers" Released: 1998; 2. "Asian Vibes" Released: 22 February 1999

One and One Is One is the debut studio album by English dance music group Joi, released on 23 February 1999 by Real World Records.

== Background and composition ==
One and One Is One takes its title from a metaphysical Bengali poem. The album mixes the Farook and Haroon Shamsher's club interests with their regard for ancestral folk roots. It fuses drum and bass, techno, breakbeats and hip hop with traditional Asian. sounds of sitar, flutes and tablas.

== Critical response ==
Professional ratings
Review scores
Source	Rating
AllMusic	3/5 stars
Indian Electronica	5/5 stars
Stereo & Video	3/5 stars

Rick Anderson of AllMusic said, "...nothing on this album is less than pleasant, but too, not much of it is more than just pleasant." Jane Cornwell of The Independent said, "As with their live work, the album has been crafted to take the listener on a journey." Tad Hendrickson of CMJ New Music Report said of the album, "The auspicious, skillfully executed debut presents even more possibilities to the expanding genre of raga groove." Sarah Pratt of CMJ New Music Monthly thought "Joi's distinctive sound is most compelling..."

== Track listing ==
All lyrics are written by Farook Shamsher and Haroon Shamsher except "Fingers" and "Oh My People" by Susheela Raman.

No.	Title	Lyrics	Length
1.	"Fingers" (featuring Susheela Raman)		6:34
2.	"Everybody Say Yeah"		5:52
3.	"Asian Vibes" (featuring Susheela Raman)		5:46
4.	"Massive"		5:49
5.	"Oh My People" (featuring Susheela Raman)	Susheela Raman	5:21
6.	"ESY-SHJ"		7:22
7.	"March On"		6:35
8.	"Mission"		5:13
9.	"Heartbeat" (featuring Susheela Raman)		6:29
10.	"India"		6:10
11.	"Joi Bani"	Ananda Shankar	4:57
Total length:			66:02

== Personnel ==
Musicians

- Vik Sharma – guitar
- Rupert Eugster – flute
- Bongo Paul – percussion

Vocals

- Susheela Raman

== Awards ==
Year	Award	Category	Result
1999	BBC	Asian Music Award	Won
