= Anokha – Soundz of the Asian Underground =

Compilation album by Talvin Singh
- Released: 17 June 1997
- Recorded: 1997
- Genre: Electronica, Indian music
- Length: 71:49
- Label: Polygram
- Producer: Talvin Singh

Talvin Singh chronology
Anokha – Soundz of the Asian Underground (1997)	OK (1998)

Anokha – Soundz of the Asian Underground is a compilation album.

== Background ==
This 1997 album arose from the Anokha music club night, formed by its host Talvin Singh and Sweety Kapoor, with music producer/DJ State of Bengal a.k.a. Sam Zaman. Anokha held weekly sessions at the legendary Blue Note venue at Hoxton Square in London's East End. The album was marketed by Mango Records, a division of Island Records. Those music sessions and this compilation helped to promote the rise of the Asian Underground movement.

The compilation was signed via Anokha's imprint label Omni Records to Island Records and led to major label deals for Talvin Singh, State of Bengal and Amar.

== Critical reception ==
Professional ratings
Review scores
Source	Rating
AllMusic	4/5 stars
Entertainment Weekly	B+
The Guardian	3/5 stars
Muzik	9/10
Rolling Stone	3.5/5 stars
Spin	8/10
The Village Voice	C+

Reviewing for The Village Voice in December 1997, Robert Christgau appraised the album negatively: "With zip to do with bhangra, and no commitment to drum 'n' bass, here's a travelogue designed to remind us that tabla players (presenter Talvin Singh, for instance!) have been hand-producing something like breakbeats for years. Not exactly like breakbeats, though. Anyway, who buys records solely for breakbeats? (Wait, I don't want to know.)" AllMusic's John Bush was more enthusiastic, deeming it "a startlingly natural-sounding fusion of Indian music and instruments with drum'n'bass, breakbeats and electronics, unlike other worldbeat-influenced electronic recordings which feature an abundance of styles but rarely approach true fusion." Bush highlighted Singh and State of Bengal's songs, as well as "K-Ascendant" by Kingsuk Biswas.

== Track listing ==
No.	Title	Artist	Length
1.	"Jaan"	Talvin Singh	6:02
2.	"Flight IC408"	State of Bengal	7:21
3.	"Kizmet"	Lelonek	5:16
4.	"Shang High"	Future Soundz of India	5:52
5.	"Chittagong Chill"	State of Bengal	8:25
6.	"Mumbai Theme Tune"	A. R. Rahman	5:15
7.	"Distant God"	Talvin Singh	6:17
8.	"Heavy Intro"	Amar	3:08
9.	"Equation"	Equal I	5:59
10.	"Spiritual Masterkey"	Osmani Soundz	5:14
11.	"Accepting Trankuility"	Milky Bar Kid	8:39
12.	"K-Ascendant"	Kingsuk Biswas	4:32
Total length:			71:49
