= State of Bengal =

British music producer (1965–2015)

- Also known as: Sam Zaman
- Born: Saifullah Zaman; 17 April 1965; East Pakistan
- Origin: London, England
- Died: 19 May 2015 (aged 50) United Kingdom
- Genres: Breakbeat; Indian classical; electronica; breakbeat; house; drum and bass; dub
- Occupations: DJ; music producer; musician; teacher; composer
- Instruments: Turntables; bass; electronic drums; percussion
- Years active: 1987–2015
- Labels: EMI; Virgin; Realworld; Six Degrees; Betelnut

Saifullah "Sam" Zaman (17 April 1965 – 19 May 2015), known by the stage name State of Bengal, was a British DJ and music producer of Bangladeshi descent associated with the UK and Asian Underground movement.

== Early life ==
Zaman was born on 17 April 1965 in then East Pakistan. He lived in Ankara, Amman, and Dhaka before moving to London, England at the age of eight. His parents are of Bangladeshi origin, from the district of Noahkhali. His father is a homeopathic doctor.

== Career ==
In 1987, Zaman set up the State of Bengal group in London after a visit to Noakhali, Bangladesh, where he interacted with traditional folk musicians and dancers. Original members of the group included his youngest brother Deeder Zaman (who later became vocalist of Asian Dub Foundation). Outside of the State of Bengal project, Zaman also worked with British Asian youth groups, setting up music training workshops. After working in a variety of communities from across the country. Sam founded and set up Betelnut Records.

Formerly a teacher, Zaman worked at youth centres. State of Bengal was a DJ at the Anokha club in London's East End during the mid-1990s. His tracks "Flight IC408" and "Chittagong Chill" – written and produced with Matt Mars – were featured on Anokha – Soundz of the Asian Underground compilation, and helped him gain prominence. Singer Björk discovered his work at Anokha, he opened for her on the Homeogenic world tour, and remixed her track "Hunter", also signing to the One Little Indian record label. State of Bengal took up residency at the 333, in Hoxton on the Off Centre club nights, he continued with his DJ and did extensive remix work.

He produced his debut album, Visual Audio in 1998 which also featured Suzana Ansar and followed that up with Walking On, a collaboration with Ananda Shankar in 1999. His next album was also a collaboration, Tana Tani with Paban Das Baul, in 2004 and then in 2007 he released Skip-ji on his own record label.

Alongside his DJ and music work, Zaman continued to teach and deliver music workshops.

== Personal life and death ==
Zaman was the eldest of five siblings, with two younger sisters and two brothers. His family called him Arun, which means sun rising.

On 19 May 2015 Zaman died in hospital of a suspected heart attack.

On 15 June 2017, the British Plaque Trust honoured Zaman by unveiling a Blue Plaque outside his home and studio in East London, where all his albums were created.

== Discography ==
=== Singles ===
Year	Single	Album
1997	Elephant Ride	Visual Audio
1997	Flight IC408	
1998	Rama Communication	Visual Audio

=== Albums ===
Title	Album details
Visual Audio	First released 1998 One Little Indian
Walking On, The Ananda Shankar Experience & State of Bengal	1999 Real World Records
Tana Tani, State of Bengal Vs Paban Das Baul	2004 Real World Records
Skip-IJ	2007 Betelnut Records

=== Compilations ===
Year	Artist(s)	Title	Label
1996	Various artists	Anokha - Soundz of the Asian Underground	Omni/Island Records
2004	Paban Das Baul	Tana Tani	Real World

=== Remixes and other work ===
Year	Artist(s)	Title	Album/Single	Label
1997	Björk	"Hunter" remix	"Hunter" (single)	One Little Indian Records
1998	Massive Attack	Inertia Creeps	Mezzanine – The Remixes (album)	Virgin Records
1998	Nusrat Fateh Ali Khan	"Shadow"	Star Rise: Nusrat Fateh Ali Kahn and Michael Brook Remixed	Realworld Records
1998	Ronnie Jordon	New Delhi Island	Unreleased	
1999	Amar	"Day By Day", "If You Say That You Love Me", "Sometimes It Snows in April"	Unreleased	Warner Bros. Records
1999	Euphoria	"Delirium" Delhi Rias Mix	Delirium Remixes (single)	Six Degrees Records
1999	Cheb i Sabbah	"Shri Durga"	Tantra Lounge (album)	Six Degrees Records
2000	Jolly Mukherjee	"Madhuvanthi", "Jhinjoti", "Sarang"	Fusebox (album)	Palm Pictures
2000	Mindless Self Indulgence	"Bitches" remix	"Bitches/Molly" (single)	Elektra Records
2000	Solar Twins	"Rock the Casbah" remix	"Rock the Casbah" (single)	Maverick Records
2001	Khaled	"Mal Habibti"		Barclay Records
2001	Amar and Khaled	"El harba wine"		Barclay Records

== See also ==
- Asian Underground
- British Bangladeshi
- List of British Bangladeshis
