= Walking On =

Studio album by Ananda Shankar and State of Bengal
- Released: 13 September 1999
- Recorded: July 1998
- Genre: Folk; rock; World music; Indian; Hindustani classical; psychedelic rock; jazz
- Length: 65:10
- Language: English
- Label: Real World
- Producer: State of Bengal

Ananda Shankar chronology
Arpan (2000)	Walking On (1999)	A Life in Music: Best of the EMI Years (2005)

State of Bengal chronology
Visual Audio (1999)	Walking On (1999)	Tana Tani (2004)

Walking On is a studio album by musicians Ananda Shankar and State of Bengal, released on 12 September 1999 by Real World Records.

== Background ==
State of Bengal (Zaman) learned to play bass in three weeks for the project.

== Critical response ==
Professional ratings
Review scores
Source	Rating
AllMusic	4.5/5 stars
Indian Electronica	5/5 stars

Peggy Latkovich of AllMusic said of Walking On, "It's all delivered with lavish abandon and a sense of fun. Dig it." Prasad Bidaye of Exclaim! said of the album, "It simply rocks, albeit in a different language, and that's rare in such instances of east-west fusion.

Indian Electronica rated the album 5/5 and called it "...an extremely fun album that has oodles of 1960s/70s Bollywood Funk. Not cheesy, but 'paneery.'" Biz of EthnoTechno said, "Folk instrumental melodies, phat beats, mesmerizing loops, and swirling flourishes of sonic waves. Have yourself a taste!"

== Track listing ==
No.	Title	Length
1.	"Walking On"	4:56
2.	"Tori"	8:15
3.	"Pluck"	6:39
4.	"Alma Ata"	4:59
5.	"Jungle Symphony" (live)	3:38
6.	"Betelnutters"	6:20
7.	"Tanusree"	6:08
8.	"Throw Down"	5:29
9.	"Love and Passion"	6:12
10.	"Reverse"	6:50
11.	"Streets of Calcutta" (live)	4:44
Total length:		65:10
