= Joi (band) =

British Bangladeshi techno hip-hop group from 1983

- Origin: East End of London, England
- Genres: dub; hip hop; electronic; acid house; techno; trance; funk; dance
- Years active: 1983–present
- Labels: Rhythm King; BPM; Nation; Transglobal; ZYX Music; Realworld
- Members: Farook Shamsher
- Past members: Haroon Shamsher (1983–1999)

Joi is a British alternative dub/dance music DJ team of Bangladeshi origin, originally composed of brothers Farook and Haroon Shamsher. Haroon died on 8 July 1999, and the remaining brother has continued Joi alone.

== Background ==
Joi initially consisted of brothers Farook (born 24 October 1968) and Haroon Shamsher (14 November 1965 – 8 July 1999), born in Bradford, West Yorkshire, England, and brought up in the East End of London to a Bangladeshi father and an Indian mother. Their passion for music developed at a young age, as their father was a professional flautist who had a shop in Brick Lane selling saris and musical instruments he imported from India. He also had Hindi, Indian classical, and traditional Bengali music records, and ran a traditional music shop. Their father would organise sessions and record with Baul artists, and sell the tapes.

Farook and Haroon grew up watching Indian musicians record in a makeshift studio in their father's retail store. They grew up listening to people such as Nusrat Fateh Ali Khan, and were influenced by reggae, hip hop, and soul. They fused Indian and Pakistani rhythms with modern dance grooves.

Joi was formed, originally working under the banners 'League Of Joi Bangla Youth Organisation' and 'Joi Bangla', a collective set up in 1983 to promote Bengali culture to children in their local East London area. They started out in the context of community work and events and subsequently became active members of a growing Asian dance scene in England. Out of this Bengali youth movement came the Joi Bangla sound system formed by Farook and Haroon Shamsher, fusing Asian influences with Western beats and fusing the sounds of traditional Bengali music with hip hop and contemporary dance styles. They spun records in local youth clubs around the Brick Lane area of London.

In 1983, they mixed these elements together and began DJing at clubs as the Joi Bangla Sound System, before becoming the more dance-oriented Joi six years later, bolstered by Arts Council funding and aiming to promote Bengali youth culture. After 10 years as club DJs, the pair began recording their own material in their father's studio. In July 1999, Farook told The Independent, "We're about politics, race, religion, and music all-in-one".

== Recording ==
In 1988, Joi's white label single "Taj Ma House" was released, and they began introducing their own material into Joi Bangla sets. In 1992, they released their debut single, "Desert Storm", which was named single of the week in NME. In 1993, they set up the Joi club night in London. In 1994, they appointed Charles Cosh as their manager.

In 1996, they released the Bangladesh EP on Nation Records and performed at that year's World of Music, Arts and Dance (WOMAD) festival, where they caught the attention of Peter Gabriel and subsequently signed to his Real World label the following year. They remixed "Sweet Pain", a track by Nusrat Fateh Ali Khan, for inclusion on the Star Rise tribute album in 1997. They released the limited-edition single "Fingers" in December 1998. A Justin Robertson remix was popular on the club scene and paved the way for the follow-up, "Asian Vibes", issued in 1999. The debut album, One and One Is One, was released in March 1999.

On 8 July 1999, Haroon died unexpectedly of a heart attack at the age of 34. He succumbed to heart failure after a week-long illness and suffered a heart attack during a hospital examination. Despite being ill, he had performed the night before. Two months before his death, Haroon visited Bangladesh for a month and made a series of field recordings, which Farook used as the basis for We Are Three, which was released in October 2001.

In January 2007, Joi's third album, Without Zero, was released.

== Performance ==
In between working in the studio, Joi had been taking their sound system to clubs around London, as well as supporting Spiritualised on their '98 British tour. Their sound system helped promote their fusion ethic regardless of trends within the music industry. Over the years the duo worked with various other artists and DJs, including Asian Dub Foundation, Athletico, Mixmaster Morris, Plaid, and Spring Heel Jack. The Joi Sound System have played at clubs and gigs, including The End, The Complex, Return To The Source, and the Ministry of Sound. By 1998, Joi had performed at over 1,500 gigs as a sound system.

They developed a live act and put on a full live show with the addition of the vocalist Susheela Raman, the guitarist Vik Sharma, and the percussionist Bongo Paul. They used traditional instruments like tabla, sitar, and flute on top of driving techno rhythms. They performed at Tribal Gathering, Whirl-Y-Gig, World of Music, Arts and Dance, Big Chill, Wembley Conference Centre, and Swaraj, as well as others around Europe, taking them as far afield as Bucharest, Rome, Madrid, and Geneva. They also performed live radio sessions with Andy Kershaw (BBC Radio 1), XFM, and Greater London Radio.

Joi is co-managed by Charles Cosh and Ben Batson of London-based Molosha Management Ltd. Sam Kirby of the New York-based Evolution Talent Agency handles its bookings.

== Legacy ==
On 15 June 2017, the British Plaque Trust honoured Haroon Shamsher by unveiling a Blue Plaque in Brick Lane, where he lived with his family.

== Awards ==
Year	Work	Award	Category	Result
1993	"Desert Storm"	NME magazine	Single of the Week	Won
1999	One and One Is One	BBC	Asian Music Award	Won
2006	Farook Shamsher	UK Asian Music Awards	Commitment to Scene	Won

== Discography ==
=== Albums ===
Title	Album details	Peak chart positions	Certifications
One and One Is One	Released: 12 April 1999; Label: Real World Records; Formats: CD, Digital Download		
We Are Three	Released: 25 September 2000; Label: Real World Records; Formats: CD, Digital Download		
Without Zero	Released: 18 February 2007; Label: Real World Records; Formats: CD, Digital Download		

=== Singles ===
Year	Single	Chart positions	Label
1988	"Taj Ma House"		BPM Records
1988	"Funky Asian"		BPM Records
1992	"Desert Storm"		Transglobal
1996	"Spiritual Get Together"		ZYX Music
1998	"Fingers"		Real World Records
1999	"Asian Vibes"		Real World Records
1999	"Deep Asian Vibes"		Real World Records

=== EP ===
Title	Album details	Peak chart positions	Certifications
Bangladesh EP	Released: 1988; Label: Nation Records; Formats: CD		

=== Collaborations and contributions ===
Year	Title	Artist	Album	Label
1997	Goddess	Nusrat Fateh Ali Khan	Eastern Uprising	Sony
1997	India	Various Artists	Global Explorer	Zip Dog
1998	Sweet Pain	Nusrat Fateh Ali Khan	Star Rise	Real World Records
1998	Shanti	Various Artists	Further East-Westercisms	Law And Auder

== See also ==
- Asian Underground
- British Bangladeshis
- List of British Bangladeshis
