= We Are Three =

Studio album by Joi
- Released: 16 October 2000
- Genre: Electronic; folk; World music; Jazz; big band; dance; techno; breakbeat
- Length: 57:06
- Language: English
- Label: Real World
- Producer: Ashley Wales; Farook Shamsher; John Coxon

Joi chronology
One and One Is One (1999)	We Are Three (2000)	Without Zero (2007)

We Are Three is the second studio album by English dance music group Joi, released on 15 October 2000 by Real World Records.

== Background ==
Two months before his death, Haroon visited Bangladesh for a month and made a series of field recordings which Farook used as the basis for We Are Three.

== Critical response ==
Professional ratings
Review scores
Source	Rating
AllMusic	3/5 stars

Philip Van Vleck of Billboard called We Are Three "...a powerful message from the Asian underground music scene..." Peggy Latkovich of AllMusic said, "We Are Three shows Farook Shamsher's skill as a manipulator of sounds and serves as worthy testimony to his brother's memory." Vinita Ramani of Exclaim! said, "We Are Three's strength is the story that fuels the album's conception, a story whose mood infuse the entirety of this album."

== Track listing ==
No.	Title	Length
1.	"Journey"	7:17
2.	"Prem" (featuring Rojina Beagum)	7:05
3.	"Don't Cha Know That"	7:26
4.	"The Holy Side" (featuring Susheela Raman)	6:44
5.	"Deep Asian Vibes"	6:35
6.	"Triatma"	7:22
7.	"Flying with You"	3:43
8.	"Tacadin"	5:31
9.	"We Need Your Vote"	5:23
Total length:		57:06

== Personnel ==
- Khutub Uddin – flute
- Panna Dash – lute
- Mohamed Washin – tabla
- Mads Bjerke – recording engineer
