= Andrew Catlin =

English photographer, artist, director, cinematographer and filmmaker

- Born: 1960 (age 65–66); London, England
- Citizenship: British
- Education: Durham University
- Occupations: Photographer, artist, director, cinematographer
- Years active: 1981–present
- Children: Alexander, Felix
- Parent(s): Harry Catlin, Joan Catlin
- Awards: Prince Philip Prize
- Website: www.andrewcatlin.com

Andrew Catlin (born 1960) is an English photographer, artist, director, cinematographer and filmmaker. His work has been widely published, and is included in numerous collections, books, exhibitions and archives.

His work is held in the collection of the National Portrait Gallery, London. and the National Gallery of Ireland.

== Life and work ==
Catlin attended University College London and continued his studies with a psychology degree at Durham University before returning to London to do a research degree in learning and development at University College London.

Early work for NME, Melody Maker, Smash Hits, POP and Spin led to other publications, and commissions from record companies, musicians, designers and artists internationally. His work appeared on record sleeves, books and magazine covers. He was one of the photographers chosen to document the Live Aid concert in 1985 and was the largest single contributor to the subsequent exhibition and book.

During the 1980s he began directing music videos. During a visit to Japan while working with Bryan Adams, he was experimenting with a Super-8 movie camera, when Adams asked if he would film one of his live songs. The black and white clip that followed was reviewed by Chrissy Iley in Direction Magazine as a great debut. His second video, for the Cowboy Junkies track, Blue Moon was given a feature in Direction:

"Blue Moon surprised me, impressed me, and I'm hard to impress, especially with performance videos. Its approach is not clinical or technical or corporate. But its flickered lights and sepia faces strike a mood that few directors of the three-minute clip even bother to think necessary. The facial expressions are important to him, and are carefully monitored with his portraiture eye. Fortunately, MTV shared my view and put it on heavy rotation."(Chrissy Iley).

Catlin was director of photography for Elements of Mine, a film by Egyptian director Khaled El Hagar which was awarded First Prize in the Toronto Moving Pictures Festival (MoPix Award 2004).

In 2008, he began a project called "The Matrix Series", exploring graphic compositions with complex multi-frame narratives. Each piece was shot as a set of images designed to interact in multiple dimensions, combining elements of time, movement, rhythm, narrative and graphic structure, while remaining within an essentially documentary framework. In his essay "Nine Hastings Photographers" Vasileios Kantas proposes that

"Andrew Catlin's imagery formations could be considered as a study on perception. His matrix suggests a unique syntax, of which the visual elements have been formed partly coincidentally - the subject's actions - and partly in a controllable way - the photographer's decisions. The way the sub-frames are selected and positioned in the matrix is preconceived, though it does not serve the linearity of time which seems to be loosened, if not abolished. The display of the sub-frames allows different reading strategies, seemingly serving many goals simultaneously."

Sean O'Hagan, photography writer for The Observer, notes

"In his Matrix series, he has somehow merged the rigorously formal with the luminously observational. Whereas the likes of Blossfeldt and the Bechers created visual typologies, arranging plants and industrial water towers respectively in grids that echo the natural and man-made sameness of their subjects, Catlin has used the grid format to render a series of what he calls "critical" moments. The resulting images are both formally detached and acutely observational, ordered yet intimate. ... Andrew Catlin is a photographer with a scientific eye. He is obsessive, meticulous and rigorous, but also a quiet, unobtrusive observer of the everyday sublime. It shines brightly though his big pictures."

In 2021 he produced an exhibition and book of portraits, Rebel Song, exploring the connections of history and faces of Irish music. Excerpts from the book were presented by the Irish Cultural Centre in London, with commentary.

His photography is held in collections and archives, including the National Portrait Gallery, London, the National Gallery of Ireland and the Schwules Museum in Berlin.

== Exhibitions ==
- The Diorama (London) - Last Few Days
- Live Aid Exhibition (London) (1985)
- Schwules Museum (Berlin)
- British Council Touring Exhibition (international)
- NME (London)
- The Photographers' Gallery (London)
- National Portrait Gallery (London) - She Bop (2003)
- National Portrait Gallery (London) - Benjamin's Britain (2006)
- National Portrait Gallery (London) - Four Corners (2007)
- Bodelwyddan Castle - Made in 1988 Exhibition (2013)
- Tullie House Museum and Art Gallery - Picture the Poet (Carlisle) (2016)
- Beningbrough Hall (York) - Making Her Mark (2017)
- National Portrait Gallery (London) - Contemporary Portraits (2019)
- National Portrait Gallery (London) - Portraits (2024)
- National Gallery of Ireland (Dublin) - Portrait Gallery (2025)
- Artig Gallery (Munich) - Live Aid 13 July 1985 (2025)
- National Portrait Gallery (London) - Music Exhibition (2025)
- Artig Gallery (Munich) - Artists (2025)

== Publications ==
=== Books: photography credits ===
- Live Aid: The Official Book (1985), paperback ISBN 9780881010244
- King Ink by Nick Cave (1988), hardcover
- Bryan Adams by Bryan Adams and Andrew Catlin (1995)
- A Drink with Shane MacGowan (paperback & hardback) by Shane MacGowan (author), Victoria Mary Clarke (2001)
- Pogue Mahone Kiss My Arse: The Story of the Pogues by Carol Clerk (2007)
- It Crawled from the South: An R.E.M. Companion by Marcus Gray ISBN 1857023544
- Wire: Everybody Loves a History by Kevin S. Eden (1991) ISBN 9780946719075
- Nick Cave by Maximilian Dax (1999), hardcover ISBN 3931126277
- Tape Delay: Confessions from the Eighties Underground by Charles Neal (2001) ISBN 0946719020
- They're Not Laughing Now by Alexander Brattell and Andrew Catlin (2010)
- Vel by Andrew Catlin, Susheela Raman and Sam Mills (2011)
- The Jesus and Mary Chain, by Andrew Catlin, Jim Reid and Julie Reid (2012) ISBN 9781999881887.
- Here Comes Everybody: The Story of the Pogues, by James Fearnley (2014) ISBN 9780571255405
- Marc Almond's Visual Tome, by Ian David Monroe (2014)
- Marc Almond - Trials of Eyeliner, by Alex Petridis (2016)
- Sinéad O'Connor 48, by Andrew Catlin (2017) ISBN 9781999881870
- Shane MacGowan Threescore, by Andrew Catlin (2018) ISBN 9781999881863
- Rebel Song: Faces of Irish Music, by Andrew Catlin (2021) ISBN 9781999881856
- A Furious Devotion: The Authorised Story of Shane MacGowan, by Richard Balls (2021) ISBN 9781787601086
- A Drink with Shane MacGowan (Italian Edition), by Shane MacGowan and Victoria Mary Clarke (2001); paperback (2022)
- The Eternal Buzz and the Crock of Gold, by Shane MacGowan (2022). Edition of 1000 copies.
- Oh Yeah Yello 40, by Boris Blank and Dieter Meier (2021) ISBN 978-3907236352
- Humanity: Live Aid at Wembley 1985, by Andrew Catlin (2025) ISBN 978-1999881849

== Filmography ==
=== Music videos: director of photography credits ===
- David Holmes: "69 Police" (2000)
- Medal: ‘Porno Song’ (1999)
- Medal: ‘Up Here For Hours’ (1999)
- Delakota: '555' (1998)
- Delakota: 'C’mon Cincinnati' (1998)
- Ether: ‘Best Friend’ (1999)
- Satellite Beach: ‘Psycho’ (1998)
- Ether: ‘She Could Fly’ (1998)
- Iron Maiden: 'The Angel & The Gambler' (1998)
- Radiator: ‘I Am’ (1997)
- Ether: ‘If You If Really Want To Know’ (1997)
- Naimee Coleman: 'Care About You' (1996)
- Eternal: 'Secrets' (1996)
- Planet Claire: ‘Say’ (1996)
- Planet Claire: ‘21’ (1996)
- World Domination Enterprises: 'Company News' (1988)
- World Domination Enterprises: 'Can't Live Without My Radio' (1988)
- That Petrol Emotion: 'Detonate' (1993)
- Ed Harcourt: 'Black Feathers' (2009)
- William Orbit: 'Hello Waveforms' (2006)
- Princess Diana Tribute: 'We Are the World' (1997)

=== Music videos: director credit ===
- Aref Durvesh: 'Outerindia One' (dir/DOP: Catlin) (2009)
- Susheela Raman: 'Ganapati' (dir/DOP: Catlin) (2001)
- Susheela Raman: 'Salt Rain' (dir/DOP: Catlin) (2001)
- Susheela Raman: 'Maya' (dir/DOP: Catlin) (2002)
- Susheela Raman: 'Orphea' (dir/DOP: Catlin) (2010)
- Susheela Raman: 'Tomorrow Never Knows' (dir/DOP: Catlin) (2016)
- Susheela Raman: 'Annabel' (dir/DOP: Catlin) (2018)
- Susheela Raman: 'Tanpa Nama' (dir/DOP: Catlin) (2018)
- Susheela Raman: 'Ghost' (dir/DOP: Catlin) (2019)
- Susheela Raman: 'Going Down' (dir/DOP: Catlin) (2019)
- Susheela Raman: 'Spoons' (dir/DOP: Catlin) (2019)
- Susheela Raman: 'Sphinx' (dir/DOP: Catlin) (2019)
- Susheela Raman: 'Beautiful Moon' (dir/DOP: Catlin) (2019)
- Doros Quartet: 'Cherubim' (dir/DOP: Catlin) (2015)
- Deacon Blue: 'Love and Regret' (dir/DOP: Catlin) (1989)
- Pogues: 'Rainy Night in Soho' (dir/DOP: Catlin) (1991)
- Kinky Machine: 'Supernatural Giver' (dir: Catlin) (1992)
- Fin: "Sweet Obsession" (dir: Catlin) (1992)
- Pooka: "City Sick" (dir: Catlin) (1993)
- Scalaland: ‘Snow White Lies’ (dir/DOP: Catlin) (1995)
- Scalaland: ‘Call Me’ (dir/DOP: Catlin) (1995)
- Bryan Adams: 'Please Forgive Me' (dir: Catlin) (1993)
- Bryan Adams: 'Straight from the Heart '(5 screen version) (dir: Catlin) (1993)
- Bryan Adams: 'Summer of '69' (Live) (dir: Catlin) (1993)
- Bryan Adams: 'Run To You' (Live) (dir: Catlin) (1992)
- Bryan Adams: 'Into the Fire' (dir/DOP: Catlin) (1988)
- Bryan Adams: 'When the Night Comes' (dir: Catlin) (1993)
- Bryan Adams: 'Cmon Everybody' (dir: Catlin) (1993)
- Bryan Adams: 'Let's Make a Night to Remember' (dir: Catlin) (1996)
- C.C.: 'All Right' (dir/DOP: Catlin) (1995)
- C.C.: 'Beautiful' (dir/DOP: Catlin) (1995)
- C.C. 'Shelter' (dir/DOP: Catlin) (1995)
- C.C.: 'Roots Scared' (dir/DOP: Catlin) (1995)
- Linda Eder 'From This Moment On' (dir/DOP: Catlin) (1989)
- Cowboy Junkies: 'Blue Moon' (dir/DOP: Catlin) (1988)
- Green on Red 'The Quarter' (dir/DOP: Catlin) (1989)
- Green on Red 'Little Things' (dir/DOP: Catlin) (1989)
- Green on Red 'Arrested' (dir/DOP: Catlin) (1989)

=== Music longforms / concerts ===
- Bryan Adams: ‘When The Night Comes’ (Live) (dir: Catlin)
- Susheela Raman: ‘The Queen Elizabeth Hall’ (Live) 2012 (dir: Catlin)
- Susheela Raman: ‘Barbican’ (Live) 2017 (dir: Catlin)
- Susheela Raman: ‘Souq Waqif’ (Recording) 2019 (dir: Catlin)
- Susheela Raman: ‘Montpellier’ (Live) 2019 (dir: Catlin)

=== Films and documentaries: directing credits ===
- Bryan Adams: Waking Up the World CBC Documentary (1993) (dir: Catlin)
- Bryan Adams: Waking Up The World DVD Release (2003) (dir: Catlin)

=== Films and documentaries: director of photography credits ===
- Elements of Mine: (dir: Khaled El Hagar/Norbert Servos)
  - Winner First Prize – Moving Pictures Festival, Toronto (MoPix Award 2004)
- Gumball 3000: documentary of First European rally/race. (1999) (dir. Simon Hilton)

== Collections ==
- National Portrait Gallery, London: 23 prints (as of 19 June 2025)
- National Gallery of Ireland, Dublin: 2 prints (as of 19 June 2025)
