= Hafla =

Live album by Khaled
- Released: 1998
- Recorded: 1997
- Venue: Bordeaux (France); Confolens (France); Leuven (Belgium)
- Genre: Raï
- Length: 1:13:35
- Label: Barclay Records
- Producer: Khaled; Pierre Paparemborde

Khaled chronology
Sahra (1996)	Hafla (1998)	1, 2, 3 Soleils (1999)

Hafla (transl. 'Festival') is a live album by Algerian singer Khaled composed of highlights from his Kenza Tour 97 in Confolens, France and Leuven, Belgium except for the track "Chebba" which was recorded in Bordeaux.

== Track listing ==
1. "Didi" – 5:27
2. "Sahra" – 3:53
3. "Aïcha" – 5:07
4. "Chebba" – 4:54
5. "Abdel Kader" – 4:39
6. "Ouelli El Darek" – 4:39
7. "N'ssi N'ssi" – 4:07
8. "Lillah" – 4:55
9. "La Camel" – 5:44
10. "Wahrane Wahrane" – 4:47
11. "Ragda" – 5:26
12. "Walou Walou" – 5:45
13. "Mauvais Sang" – 6:56
14. "El Harba" – 7:16
