= Without Zero =

Studio album by Joi
- Released: 19 January 2007
- Genre: World music; breakbeat; drum and bass; big beat; reggae; dub; electronic
- Length: 47:42
- Language: English; Hindi; Urdu
- Label: Real World
- Producer: Farook Shamsher; Ashley Wales; Bruno Ellingham; John Coxon

Joi chronology
| We Are Three (2000) | Without Zero (2007) |

Without Zero is the third studio album by English dance music group Joi, released on 19 January 2007 by Real World Records.

== Critical response ==
Professional ratings
Review scores
| Source | Rating |
|---|---|
| AllMusic | 3.5/5 stars |
| BBC Music | 3.5/5 stars |
| Indian Electronica | 5/5 stars |

Louis Patterson of BBC Music rated Without Zero 3.5/5 and called it "A spirited, experimentally minded soundclash that's as fun as it is inspired." Stewart Mason of AllMusic rated the album 3.5/5 and said, "...there's nothing here that will change the mind of anyone thus far resistant to Shamsher's cross-cultural charms."

Derek of EthnoTechno said, "On his third Real World Release all the descriptive words fly out the window, and you're left with an album to dance to, to contemplate, and most of all, to thoroughly enjoy." Qasim Virjee of Indian Electronica rated the album 5/5 and described it as "high degrees of aural texturing".

== Track listing ==
| No. | Title | Length |
|---|---|---|
| 1. | "Praying For You" (featuring Apeksha Dandekar) | 5:22 |
| 2. | "Come Back to Me" (featuring Apeksha Dandekar) | 3:56 |
| 3. | "The Blessing" (featuring Elysha West) | 5:35 |
| 4. | "What You Are" (featuring Apeksha Dandekar) | 5:51 |
| 5. | "Cha Cha Cha" | 4:23 |
| 6. | "Forget Me Not" | 7:22 |
| 7. | "My Love" | 5:49 |
| 8. | "Amar Kahani" | 6:39 |
| 9. | "Show Me Love" (featuring Apeksha Dandekar) | 4:45 |
| Total length: | | 47:42 |

== Personnel ==
=== Musicians ===
- John Coxon – guitar
- Keefe West – guitar, lute (saz)
- Niladri Kumar – sitar
- Yazid – woodwind (zorna), oud, banjo

=== Vocals ===
- Apeksha Dandekar
- Elysha West
