= Visual Audio =

- Cover design by Rex Ray and photography by Mogul Design

Studio album by State of Bengal
- Released: 29 March 1999
- Genre: Alternative dance; drum and bass; nujazz; bebop; tribal; trip hop
- Length: 67:21
- Label: One Little Indian
- Producer: State of Bengal; Matt Mars

State of Bengal chronology
Visual Audio (1999)	Walking On (2000)

Singles from Visual Audio
- 1. "Elephant Ride" Released: 10 November 1997; 2. "Rama Communication" Released: 25 January 1999

Visual Audio is the debut studio album by English dance music DJ and music producer State of Bengal, released on 29 March 1999 by One Little Indian.

== Critical response ==
Professional ratings
Review scores
Source	Rating
AllMusic	3.5/5 stars

John Bush of AllMusic described the album as "a full-length of intriguing fusion, the harnessing of British club culture's drum'n'bass breakbeats with more traditional Indian sounds." Rob Evanoff of All About Jazz said, "If you are into an adventurous combination of both ancient and new world music mixed with the continuous energy of modern beats then strap your mind in and let the flight begin."

Vinita Ramani of Exclaim! said, "Zaman manages the transition and mood as the myriad instruments drop out and allow for his talents as a DJ/producer to emerge." Biz of EthnoTechno said of the album, "Folk instrumental melodies, phat beats, mesmerizing loops, and swirling flourishes of sonic waves. Have yourself a taste!"

== Track listing ==
No.	Title	Lyrics	Length
1.	"Flight IC 408"	Matt Mars	5:55
2.	"Elephant Ride"	State of Bengal	6:05
3.	"Burn Your Toes (vocal version)" (featuring Suzana Ansar)	State of Bengal	6:37
4.	"Chittagong Chill"	Mars	6:19
5.	"Taki Naki"	State of Bengal	6:20
6.	"Red Earth (instrumental version)"	State of Bengal	5:44
7.	"Hunters"	Mars	5:35
8.	"EK Bullet"	State of Bengal	6:07
9.	"Rama Communication"	Mars	6:07
10.	"Hectic City"	State of Bengal	5:59
11.	"Music Is"	State of Bengal	5:33
Total length:			67:21
