= Outside (Amar album) =

2000 studio album by Amar

Studio album by Amar
- Released: June 12, 2000
- Genre: Worldbeat, electronic
- Label: Blanco Y Negro
- Producer: Robin Millar, Nitin Sawhney

Amar chronology
Mein Aur Tu (1994)	Outside (2000)	Show It Off (2010)

Professional ratings
Review scores
Source	Rating
Birmingham Post	3/5 stars

Outside is an album by the British Indian singer Amar, released in 2000.

"Sometimes It Snows in April" peaked at No. 48 on the UK Singles Chart. A remix of the song was included on Mixmag's list of the "40 Best Tracks of 1995 to 2005".

== Critical reception ==
The Guardian called the album "wilfully eclectic," writing that "the songs benefit from breaking things down to the essentials, fusing [Amar's] distinctive raw vocals with blissed-out tablas, keyboards and strings." The Birmingham Post wrote that the album weds "a vocal style vaguely reminiscent of Kate Bush" to "breakbeats and lush orchestrations."

== Track listing ==
No.	Title	Length
1.	"The World"	4:53
2.	"Sometimes It Snows in April"	4:24
3.	"Claustrophobic"	6:50
4.	"Maybe"	5:22
5.	"Rain"	2:07
6.	"To an Alien Land"	5:51
7.	"Demons Win the Game"	4:32
8.	"Red Sky"	5:20
9.	"Another Tune"	3:18
10.	"Tere Bina"	4:11
11.	"After Sunset"	4:59
12.	"Morning"	3:00
