= Otm Shank =

English music producer

- Born: Rik Dobson
- Genres: House, tech house, techno, minimal, Indian Techno-Funk
- Occupations: DJ, Producer
- Instruments: Tabla
- Years active: 2015–present
- Label: Pinkturban

Rik Dobson, who is known by the stage name Otm Shank, is a British electronic music producer based in Los Angeles. He owns Pinkturban, a record label based in Los Angeles.

Dobson's music combines elements of tech house and techno with Indian classical music, in particular, the Indian hand drum tabla, which he studies with his guru, Debasish Chaudhuri, nephew of internationally renowned tabla player, Swapan Chaudhuri.

== Career ==
In November 2015, Dobson released his debut single, Ravish, via Pinkturban. The track premiered on Nemone's Electric Ladyland on BBC Radio 6 Music. Since then, his music has received airplay internationally on radio stations including 5FM, George FM, and BBC Asian Network.

In 2021, Dobson released his debut full length studio album, Who is Otm Shank?. Following the album, he collaborated with several artists on a remix EP including critically acclaimed British tabla player and music producer, Talvin Singh (Mercury Music Prize winner / OBE).

== Discography ==
=== Singles and EPs ===
- 2015: Ravish
- 2017: Bounce EP
- 2018: Kaida
- 2018: So Bazaar
- 2021: Who?
- 2021: Otm
- 2021: Dirt
- 2021: Baya
- 2021: Tamdrin
- 2021: Maharaja
- 2021: Genie
- 2021: Rani
- 2021: Biryani
- 2021: Rela
- 2021: Dirt (Evan Hatfield Remix)
- 2021: Biryani (Jey Kurmis Remix)
- 2021: Maharaja (Talvin Singh Remix)
- 2021: Who is Otm Shank? (Remixes)
- 2022: Powder

=== Remixes ===
- 2021: Evan Hatfield - It's Midnight (Otm Shank Remix)

=== Studio albums ===
- 2021: Who is Otm Shank?
