= Skip-IJ =

Studio album by State of Bengal
- Released: 2007
- Recorded: Bengal Studios in East London, England
- Genre: Electronic; hip hop; folk; World music; breakbeat; tribal; downtempo
- Length: 65:40
- Language: Bengali; English
- Label: Betelnut Records
- Producer: State of Bengal

State of Bengal chronology
Tana Tani (2004)	Skip-IJ (2007)

Skip-IJ is the fourth studio album by dance music English DJ and music producer State of Bengal, released in 2007 by Betelnut Records.

== Critical response ==
Professional ratings
Review scores
Source	Rating
AsianVibrations.com	7/10 stars
Indian Electronica	5/5 stars

Louis Patterson of BBC Music said of Skip-IJ, "Proof that the Asian Underground can be both fun and thoughtful." Gaurav of AsianVibrations.com rated it 7/10 and said of the album, "State of Bengal gives us an album that you can listen to whenever you are in a dubbed out dnb mood. This is a true classic in the making (barring a few speed bumps)." Indian Electronica said, "this album defies modern dance-floor convention with its wonderfully refreshing and bouncy rhythms - paradoxically sounding like a jazz throwback to break-beat employing an aesthetic which draws from Afro-Brazilian and Indian influence..."

== Track listing ==
No.	Title	Length
1.	"Skip-IJ" (featuring Bola Adakimi)	2:58
2.	"Hold It in My Heart" (featuring Rosina Kazi)	7:54
3.	"Play That Way" (featuring Renu Hossain)	5:16
4.	"Breathe In" (featuring Nolan Weeks)	6:18
5.	"Dushto Meyra" (featuring Susmita Banerrjee)	5:03
6.	"London to Dhaka" (featuring Deeder Zaman)	5:10
7.	"Mr. President" (featuring Rosina Kazi)	5:05
8.	"Get Down Like This" (featuring Bola Ademkimi)	4:45
9.	"Cha Na Na Na" (featuring Johanna Marin and Renu Hossain)	4:32
10.	"Sukno Patar" (featuring Coco Varma and Suzana Ansar)	5:28
11.	"Future People (Tsunami)" (featuring Pundit Dinesh)	6:03
12.	"Trip to the Moon" (featuring Johanna Ramin and Marque Gilmore)	7:08
Total length:		65:40

== Personnel ==
- Luke Gifford – recording engineer
- State of Bengal – mix engineer
