= El Harba Wine =

Single by Khaled featuring Amar

from the album Kenza
- Language: Algerian Arabic; Hindi
- B-side: "Mele H'Bibti"
- Written: 1987
- Released: 2000
- Recorded: 1987—1999
- Studio: A-Wave (London); Etab (Cairo); Ridge Farm (Surrey)
- Genre: Raï; kabyle; filmi
- Length: 4:35 (album version) 3:50 (single version)
- Label: Barclay Records
- Composers: Khaled Hadj Ibrahim; Hamid Cheriet
- Lyricists: Khaled Hadj Ibrahim; Amarpreet Dhanjan; Mohamed Angar; Mohamed Benhamadouche
- Producer: Steve Hillage

Khaled singles chronology
"C'est la nuit" (1999)	"El Harba Wine" (2000)	"Time For A Change" (2000)

Amar singles chronology
"Red Sky" (1999)	"El Harba Wine" (2000)	"Sometimes It Snows In April" (2000)

Music video
- "El Harba Wine" on YouTube

"El Harba Wine" is a song by Algerian singer-songwriter Khaled featuring British-Indian singer Amar. It was released on 2000 by Barclay Records as a single from Khaled's fourth album, Kenza. "El Harba Wine" loosely translates to "Run away, but where to?". Khaled explains the title as "You want to leave your country? Where do you want to go?". The song is also sometimes referred to by the title "El Harba". The credited writers for the lyrics are Mohamed Angar, Khaled, Amar, and Mohamed Benhamadouche, and for the music Khaled and Idir.

== Background and composition ==
"El Harba Wine" is an Arabic cover version of "Zwit Rwit", an Amazigh song by the Algerian Idir. The original Arabic cover version was recorded by Khaled in 1987 and released in 1988 as a track from his album, Fuir, Mais Où?. The release coincided with Algeria's civil unrest of October 1988.

A live version of the song was included in Khaled's live album Hafla. A rare flamenco inspired version of the song was included in Sahra's promotional CD. Khaled's 1999 album Kenza included a remake of "El Harba Wine" featuring Indian fused beats and Hindi verses sung by Amar. Billboard described this version as a "mesmerizing merging" of Khaled and Amar's singing, "equal parts world music and tribal house".

== Track listings ==
=== CD single – Version 1 ===
1. "El Harba Wine (Edit Version)" - 3:50
2. "Mele h'bibti" - 6:29
3. "El Harba (unreleased version)" - 4:13
4. "El Harba (Live Version)" - 7:08 (from the album "Hafla")

=== CD single (remixes) ===
1. "El Harba Wine (Edit Version)" - 3:50
2. "El Harba Wine (Afro Vocal)" (Remixed by Funk Master VS Lucky Luke) - 6:42
3. "El Harba Wine (Mania 1000 Mix)" (Remixed by Fabrice Leyni) - 4:29
4. "El Harba Wine (Last Stand of the Fortress Mix)" (Remixed by Transglobal Underground) - 6:04
5. "El Harba Wine (Nitin Sawhney Mix)" (Remixed by Nitin Sawhney) - 5:25

=== 12" Single ===
1. "El Harba Wine (Afro Vocal Mix)" (Remixed by Funk Master VS Lucky Luke) - 6:47
2. "El Harba Wine (Deep Club Mix)" (Remixed by [

Magma 2001) - 7:50

1. "El Harba Wine (Dodgie Mix)" (Remixed by Funk Master VS Lucky Luke) - 6:49
2. "El Harba Wine (Powerful Dub)" (Remixed by Funk Master VS Lucky Luke) - 6:11
