= Shiva Soundsystem =

- Founded: 2000
- Founder: Nerm
- Country of origin: United Kingdom
- Location: London

Shiva Soundsystem is a collective, record label and event host based in East London. Shiva Soundsystem grew out of the Asian Underground scene in London and went on to become more associated with other styles including drum and bass and electronica.

Formed by DJ and broadcaster Nerm out of musicians performing on his DJ sets, it evolved into a band, including early appearances of Foreign Beggars frontman Orifice Vulgatron and Prash Mistry from Engine Earz. It then developed into a sprawling collective of artists with a large warehouse HQ in Hackney.

== History ==
=== 2000–2003 – Formation ===
Nerm and Renu Hossain where bandmates in electro punk band Charged signed to Nation Records. Nerm was increasingly becoming a headline DJ, especially with Asian Underground clubnight Swaraj, he approached Renu to beef up his sets with her on percussion. Orifice Vulgatron from Foreign Beggars joined on mic duties with Adam Henshaw on live computer sequencing and as a DJ. Shiva Soundsystem began to tour India in 2002 with Swaraj.

=== 2003–2005 – Warehouse ===
Shiva Soundsystem's next line up included Prash Mistry in Adam Henshaw's place and featuring his production as the show's musical backbone. Shiva Soundsystem set up a warehouse headquarters in East London and began hosting events, first holding massive parties at the warehouse among other spaces and then, more legally, holding down weekend residencies in East London's clubland with guests as diverse as Aphex Twin, Swami and Logistics. It was here that Shiva Soundsystem made its latest incarnation to that of a record label with a roster of artists, with D-Code (DJ) as the spearhead. In 2003 Shiva Soundsystem began to tour India every year independently. Shiva Soundsystem began to play Glastonbury annually in 2004, headlining stages in 2005 and 2008.

=== 2005–2008 ===
D-Code took the helm of head producer and the first release on Shiva Soundsystem Recordings was Mumbai Cells and was written when D-Code and Nerm toured India for the first time. This was followed by releases gaining support from drum and bass DJs Fabio, London Elecktricity and Andy C. The collective also remixed for notable acts Asian Dub Foundation, Riz MC and Swami.

Nerm mixed and released the first drum and bass/dubstep mix album especially created for India called India:One (2008), featuring 19 tracks from the Shiva Soundsystem roster and one from New York brothers-in-arms Sub Swara.

Shiva Soundsystem's releases gained support from Pete Tong, Kissy Sell Out, Pendulum and Laurent Garnier.

In 2008, D-Code was appointed head remixer for the new music game DJ Hero the follow-up to the hit Guitar Hero. His track "Annie's Horn" was the only drum and bass track on the game, mashed up and remixed with DJ Shadow.

=== 2009–present ===
In 2009, Shiva Soundsystem released their debut LP, Phasmatis in Machina (Latin for Ghost in the Machine), which hit number 3 in the D&B download chart and number 10 in the DMC chart. Collaborations on the album include UK hip hop stars Foreign Beggars, New York and Mumbai's electronic duo Shaa'ir and Func and Italy's Elio D’Anna Jr.

In March 2010, Shiva Soundsystem were nominated for "Best Alternative Act" at the UK Asian Music Awards alongside Bat For Lashes, Niraj Chag and Engine Earz In April 2010, they won a BRIT Asia Music Award for "Best Alternative Act".

In December 2010, they took Caspa on tour to India, the first international dubstep artist to do so.

In 2011, Shiva Soundsystem produced the soundtrack to the film Everywhere and Nowhere.

From 2012 onwards, Shiva Soundsystem developed D-Code's new live band, Driving Lolita, and Arrows Down, a solo project from Driving Lolita vocalist Tom Cameron.

== Broadcasting ==
In June 2004, Shiva Soundsystem were the subject of a half-hour "One World" special on BBC Radio 1 hosted by Nerm about alternative styles of music in the Asian Music scene. This was followed up in May 2006 with another Shiva Soundsystem focussed One World radio show, this time for two hours.

In June 2006, the BBC Asian Network signed Shiva Soundsystem's Nerm to host their weekly alternative music show Electro East.

In 2008, Shiva Soundsystem's DJ sets attracted the attention of BBC Radio 1, and they started their own show at the station.

Nerm and D-Code have also stepped in for Mary Anne Hobbs, sharing the mic and air-waves with Annie Mac, Pete Tong, Zane Lowe, Fabio & Grooverider and featuring a wide range of guests including Matt Helders from Arctic Monkeys, Norman Jay, Marky, Rusko, Foreign Beggars, Sub Focus, The Count & Sinden. They also played the stations flagship Big Weekend alongside Eric Prydz and 2 Many DJs. The duo maintain close ties with the station and regularly appear as presenters across the BBC networks with Nerm presenting his weekly underground music show on the BBC, Electro East.

== Discography ==
=== Albums ===
- India:One (2008)
- Phasmatis in Machina (2009)
- India:Two (2009 – India Only)

=== Singles and EPs ===
- Shiva Soundsystem – Mumbai Cells SSR001 (2005)
- D-Code & Chan1 – The Mutation/Rebirth SSR002 (2006)
- D-Code – Isolation EP SSR003 (2008)
- D-Code & Chan1 – Glitterstep SSR004 (2008)
- D-Code feat Nerm – Outlaw SSR006 (2009)
- D-Code – Annies Horn EP SSR007 (2009)
