= Amar (British singer) =

British singer

- Born: Amar Dhanjan
- Origin: Indian
- Genres: Hip hop, filmi
- Occupation(s): Singer, songwriter
- Instrument: Vocals
- Years active: 1997–present
- Labels: Sunset Entertainment

Amar (born Amar Dhanjan) is a British Indian singer signed to the independent label Sunset Entertainment Group. She is also the daughter of Mangal Singh (a well-known singer in the UK and globally known for his "Rail Gaddi" song). She is a singer and songwriter who writes her own material. She has a unique style of combining her Hindi vocals, lyrics, and melodies with western urban producers.

== Biography ==
Amar grew up in Walsall, West Midlands, United Kingdom. She is the daughter of singer Mangal Singh who is famous for the song "Jaandi". Amar herself catapulted to fame as a young girl with her hit single "Tu Hai Mera Sanam", a Hindi cover of Dolly Parton's "I Will Always Love You", which was also covered by Whitney Houston. In her teens, she moved to London and discovered the Asian underground scene. She collaborated with Talvin Singh and featured on the song "Jaan" from his 1997 album Anokha - Soundz of the Asian Underground. She appeared on the album I'm Too Sexy (1997), a compilation album of electronic music mixed with Hindi-Pakistani sounds. Later, she featured on the song "I'm So Sexy" by Talvin Singh. Amar also recorded a solo song called "Why Am I So Sexy". In 1999, she was featured in a duet with Cheb Khaled on the song "El Harba Wine" from Khaled's album Kenza; Amar also appeared in the music video as herself. In 2000, she scored a UK chart hit with her cover of the Prince song "Sometimes It Snows in April", which was popular in a garage remix by Dreem House. Mixmag included the remix in their list of "40 of the best UK garage tracks released from 1995 to 2005". The 1994 song "Sitam - Mohabbat Ka Rang", a Hindi cover of Jennifer Rush's "The Power of Love", was featured in the 2002 film Bend It Like Beckham.

== Awards ==
In 2010, Amar won "Best Female Act" at the UK Asian Music Awards (UK AMAs).

== Discography ==
=== Albums ===
- 1994: Mein Aur Tu
- 2000: Outside
- 2010: Show It Off

=== Singles ===
- 2000: "Sometimes It Snows in April" - UK No. 48

=== Appearances ===
- "El Harba Wine" (2000) by Khaled featuring Amar on his album Kenza (1999)
- Hindi-language cover of "I Will Always Love You" originally by Dolly Parton
- "Sitam", Hindi-language cover of "The Power of Love" originally by Jennifer Rush, featured in the 2002 film Bend It Like Beckham
- "Bombay" by Timbaland featuring Amar and Jim Beanz from the album Timbaland Presents Shock Value (2007)
- Remixes of "Promiscuous" and "Maneater", singles released by Nelly Furtado's from her album Loose (2007)
- "The Source of Secrets" by Mike Oldfield featuring Amar on his album Tubular Bells III (1998)
- Additional sounds on Chris Cornell's "Take Me Alive" (2009)
- Background vocals on Timbaland's "If We Ever Meet Again" (2009)
