= Show It Off =

Studio album by Amar
- Released: 15 February 2010
- Genre: Hip hop, R&B, filmi
- Label: Sunset Entertainment

Amar chronology
Outside (2000)	Show It Off (2010)

Show It Off is a 2010 music album by British Indian singer Amar.

== Track listing ==
No.	Title	Length
1.	"Loye Loye"
2.	"Bombay Billionaire feat. Sonu Nigam"
3.	"Sajana feat. Shankar Mahadevan"
4.	"See Me Girl feat. Apache Indian"
5.	"Show It Off feat. Rebel"
6.	"Maanga feat. el Feco"
7.	"Masala feat. Jim Beanz & D.O.E."
8.	"Dil Ruba"
9.	"Saajan"
10.	"Teri Bahon"
11.	"Tonight feat. Cavan"
12.	"Deewana feat. Mangal Singh"
13.	"Dekhne Tumko Tarsa Naina"
14.	"Jaana Hai Humne Yeh Kyun feat. Kufie & Cavan"
15.	"Teri Bahon (Rock Mix)"
16.	"Chup Chupke feat. Rebel"
