= Salt Rain =

Studio album by Susheela Raman
- Released: May 8, 2001
- Studio: Real World Studios, Box, Wiltshire; Bellaphonix; cello recorded at The Sound Studio, Stoke Newington, London
- Length: 58:20
- Label: Narada
- Producer: Sam Mills

Susheela Raman chronology
Salt Rain (2001)	Love Trap (2003)

Salt Rain is the 2001 debut album by Susheela Raman. The album was a Mercury Music Prize nominee.

== Track listing ==
1. "Ganapati" (Traditional, Muthuswami Dikshitar; arranged by Sam Mills and Susheela Raman) - 6:42
2. "Maya" (Matthew Q. Jones, Sam Mills, Susheela Raman) - 4:36
3. "Mamavatu" (Traditional, Sri Vasudevachar; arranged by Sam Mills and Susheela Raman) - 3:52
4. "Woman" (Sam Mills, Susheela Raman) - 4:24
5. "Mahima" (Traditional, Tyagaraja; arranged by Sam Mills and Susheela Raman) - 7:29
6. "Trust in Me" (Richard M. Sherman, Robert B. Sherman) - 3:23
7. "Bolo Bolo" (Traditional; arranged by Ayub Ogada and Susheela Raman) - 2:12
8. "Salt Rain" (Sam Mills, Susheela Raman) - 4:40
9. "Kamakshi" (Traditional, Muthuswami Dikshitar; arranged by Susheela Raman) - 4:52
10. "Nagumomo" (Traditional, Tyagaraja; arranged by Sam Mills and Susheela Raman) - 4:47
11. "O Rama" (Traditional, Tyagaraja; arranged by Ayub Ogada, Sam Mills and Susheela Raman) - 4:53
12. "Song to the Siren" (Larry Beckett, Tim Buckley) - 6:30
