= Bangladesh EP =

EP by Joi
- Released: 21 October 1996
- Genre: Electronic; techno; progressive house; break
- Length: 21:00
- Language: English
- Label: Nation

Joi chronology
| Bangladesh EP (1996) | One and One Is One (1999) |

Bangladesh EP is an EP by English dance music group Joi, released on 26 October 1996 by Nation Records.

== Background and release ==
The aim of Bangladesh EP was to show the conflicts in Bangladesh by foreign countries. The EP was released on 26 October 1996 by Nation Records.

== Track listing ==
| No. | Title | Length |
|---|---|---|
| 1. | "High Times" | 5:56 |
| 2. | "Nargin" | 6:54 |
| 3. | "E.sy" (Spring Heel Jack Mix) | 7:20 |
| Total length: | | 21:00 |
