= Visionary Underground =

- Also known as: VU
- Origin: London, England
- Genres: Drum and bass/Breakbeat
- Label: VU Recordings
- Website: http://www.visionaryunderground.com

Official Visionary Underground logo

Visionary Underground is a technology driven, audio-visual collective from London that was formed in 2001 by DJ Feel Free and VJ Coco. Their music is characterized by a mix of UK hip hop, ragga, soul, dub, and Asian genres.

== History ==
In the spirit of Visionary Underground's founding nature, the label VU Recordings was created by the group to overcome a lack of opportunity for the group in the music industry.

"When no-one gives you an opportunity – you have to make your own."

— Visionary Underground

Before the release of "Keep The Grime On", VU Recordings released four 12" vinyl singles and one CD/vinyl single.

Militant 24-7 from the Keep The Grime On album was chosen as the TV title music for BBC 2 Asian arts and culture program: Desi DNA, while a selection of VU tracks has also seen their way onto a variety of compilation albums including FabricLive15 and Peace Not War - Volume Two.

Nov 2006 saw the release of Dr Das's solo debut album "Emergency Basslines" under the VU Recordings Label.

In an interview for SOAS Radio in 2017, Coco Das stated that nowadays they prefer to describe themselves as an audio-visual collective and instead a drum and bass/breakbeat band. In the same interview, Coco Das discussed their history and track production notes.

== Lineup ==
Founders

- FeelFree (DJ/Producer)
- Coco Das (VJ/Visual Artist)
- Damion Mulrain (Vocalist/Lyricist)
- Duane Flames (Rap/Lyricist)

Featured Artists

- Dr Das (founder member and formerly of Asian Dub Foundation) (live bass)
- Bobby "sox" Demers (live jungle/breakbeat drummer)
- Yap (Pink Punk)
- Asian Dub Foundation ft Sinéad O'Connor
- Nitin Sawhney
- Aref Durvesh (tabla maestro)
- Chandru (bollywoodstrings.com)
- Pandit Dinesh (tabla and percussion guru)
- MC Navigator (of Freestylers fame)
- Sonia Mehta (Indian vocalist)

== Discography ==
Released	Albums	Singles
2002		Urban Dubz/ Urban Uproar
2002		Feeling Good/ Ride
2003	Demo Copy	
2004		Countries at War
2005		Eye Of The Storm
2005	Keep The Grime On	
2008	Fired Up	
2009		Get The Beers In
