= Kenza (album) =

Studio album by Khaled
- Released: December 7, 1999
- Recorded: 1999
- Studios: A-Wave Studio (London); Dangerous Music Studio (New York); Etab Studio (Cairo); Ridge Farm Studios (Surrey); Studio Bastille (Paris)
- Genre: Raï
- Length: 1:18:34
- Label: Universal Records
- Producers: Steve Hillage; Jean Jacques Goldman; Christophe Battaglia; Lati Kronlund

Khaled chronology
1,2,3 Soleils (1999)	Kenza (1999)	Ya-Rayi (2004)

Kenza (Arabic: كنزة) is a fourth studio album by Algerian singer-songwriter Khaled. It was released on December 7, 1999. The album was named after his second daughter, Kenza, which means "treasure" in Arabic.

The album was re-released by Ark 21 and Wrasse Records on April 4, 2000. It is featured in Robert Dimery's 1001 Albums You Must Hear Before You Die.

There are tracks that are re-recorded versions of his classic songs, which are: "El Harba Wine," "Trigue Lycee," "E'dir E'sseba," "El Bab," "El Aâdyene," "Mele H'bibti" and "Gouloulha-Dji"

== Critical reception ==
Professional ratings
Review scores
Source	Rating
Allmusic	2.5/5 stars

Kenza has attained gold certification by Syndicat National de l'Edition Phonographique.

== Track listing ==
=== Standard edition ===
Label: Barclay (Universal)

1. "Aâlach Tloumouni" – 5:02
2. "El Harba Wine" (featuring Amar) – 4:33
3. "C'est la nuit" – 5:04
4. "Imagine" (featuring Noa) – 4:07
5. "Trigue Lycee" – 4:43
6. "E'dir E'sseba" – 5:50
7. "Ya Aâchkou" – 3:57
8. "Melha" – 6:07
9. "Raba-Raba" – 5:37
10. "El Bab" – 5:28
11. "El Aâdyene" – 5:37
12. "Gouloulha-Dji" – 5:37
13. "Mele H'bibti" – 6:29
14. "Derwiche Tourneur" – 6:00
15. "Leïli" ("C'est la nuit" Arab version) – 4:08

The Barclay edition, 543 397 2, contains full sung texts in French or Arabic romanization.

=== U.S. edition ===
Label: Ark 21 USA

1. "Aâlach Tloumouni" – 5:02
2. "El Harba Wine" (featuring Amar) – 4:33
3. "Leïli" ("C'est la nuit" Arab version) – 4:08
4. "Trigue Lycee" – 4:43
5. "E'dir E'sseba" – 5:50
6. "Ya Aâchkou" – 3:57
7. "Melha" – 6:07
8. "Raba-Raba" – 5:37
9. "El Bab" – 5:28
10. "El Aâdyene" – 5:37
11. "Gouloulha-Dji" – 5:37
12. "Mele H'bibti" – 6:29
13. "Derwiche Tourneur" – 6:00
14. "Chebba (Man City Remix)" – 5:19

== Certifications ==
Kenza certifications
Region	Certification	Certified units/sales
France (SNEP)	Gold	100,000^{*}
^{^} Shipments figures based on certification alone.

== Release history ==
Kenza release history
Region	Date	Edition	Label	Catalog
Europe	7 December 1999	Standard	Universal Records	543 397-2
United States	4 April 2000	U.S Edition	Ark 21	186 850 012 2
