= Tabla Beat Science =

American musical group

Tabla Beat Science was a musical group founded in 1999 by Zakir Hussain and Bill Laswell. Its style consists of a mixture of Hindustani music, Asian Underground, ambient music, drum and bass and electronica.

In 2001 Karsh Kale was approached by super producer Bill Laswell to contribute to a project he was calling Tabla Beat Science. The album would feature the leading tabla artists who were taking the instrument into modern and exciting new contexts. Kale joined Laswell, Zakir Hussain, Trilok Gurtu and Talvin Singh to create Tala Matrix, which is considered one of the greatest modern explorations of tabla fusion in recent years. All members would contribute music to the project. The project eventually evolved into a live band featuring Kale on drums and electric tabla, Zakir Hussain on acoustic tabla, Bill Laswell on bass, Ustad Sultan Khan on Sarangi and DJ Disk on turntables. Tabla Beat Science went on to tour the world from their debut at the 16,000-strong Stern Grove concert, which eventually became a two-disc live release on Palm Pictures. Other stops included Dubai, Beirut, LA, Tokyo, London's Barbican Center, and finally at the 2nd annual Barsi concert in Mumbai honoring the death anniversary of Hussain's famous father Ustad Allah Rakha. Tabla Beat Science also had many guest artists joining their electric live concerts including Pt Hari Prasad Chaurasia, Ganesh Iyer, Salim Merchant (Salim–Sulaiman) and the Midival Punditz.

On 5 April 2005, Laswell performed a 2-hour concert at WTTW Studios, Chicago with three incarnations of his groups: Tabla Beat Science (with Hussain, Sultan Khan, DJ Disk, Karsh Kale, Selim Merchant and Nils Petter Molvaer), Material (with Pharoah Sanders, Foday Musa Suso, Hamid Drake, Aïyb Dieng and Abegasu Shiota) and Praxis (with Buckethead, Brian "Brain" Mantia and Toshinori Kondo), with Bootsy Collins performing MC duties at its climax. An hour long edit was broadcast on the Soundstage series on 13 July 2006.

== Personnel ==
- Zakir Hussain was a classical musician and accompanist.
- Trilok Gurtu is an Indian percussionist.
- Talvin Singh is an Asian Underground artist.
- Bill Laswell is a bassist, producer, and composer.
- Ustad Sultan Khan plays the sarangi.
- Fabian Alsultany a.k.a. Sultan 32 plays keyboards and electronics.
- Karsh Kale plays tabla and drum kit.
- DJ Disk plays turntable.

== Discography ==
- Tala Matrix (Axiom, 2000)
- Live in San Francisco at Stern Grove (Axiom, 2002)
- Talamanam Sound Clash: Further Adventures in Hypercussion (DVD) (Axiom, 2003)
