= Nine Lives: In Search of the Sacred in Modern India =

2009 book by William Dalrymple

- Author: William Dalrymple
- Language: English
- Subject: Travel writing/religion
- Genre: Non-fiction
- Publisher: Bloomsbury Publishing
- Publication date: 2009
- Publication place: United Kingdom
- Media type: Print (Hardcover)
- ISBN: 978-1-4088-0061-4
- OCLC: 437298635
- Preceded by: The Last Mughal
- Followed by: Return of a King

Nine Lives: In Search of the Sacred in Modern India is a 2009 travel book by William Dalrymple.

== Summary ==
Dalrymple's seventh book is about the lives of nine Indians, a Buddhist monk, a Jain nun, a lady from a middle-class family in Calcutta, a prison warden from Kerala, an illiterate goat herd from Rajasthan, and a devadasi among others, as seen during his Indian travels. The book explores the lives of nine such people, each of whom represent a different religious path in nine chapters.

- The Nun's Tale: It's a story of a Jain nun in the ancient pilgrimage town of Sravanabelagola, who after the death of her friend and fellow nun decides to take the ritual fast to death or 'Sallekhana'
- The Dancer of Kannur: Story of Hari Das, a Dalit from Kerala, who works as a manual labourer during the weeks and a prison warden during the weekends for nine months of the year. Only during the holy Theyyam season from December to February, he turns into a dancer possessed by Gods revered even by the high caste Brahmins.
- The Daughter of Yellamma: Story of the Devadasi Rani bai from Belgaum, Karnataka who was dedicated by her parents at the age of 6. Of how one of the oldest professions of India has undergone changes and adaptations through centuries. And the story of Yellamma, the goddess who was rejected by all but gives strength to the Devadasi's.
- The Singer of Epics: Story of Mohan Bhopa and his wife Batasi, two of the last hereditary singers of a great Rajasthani medieval poem, The Epic of Pabuji.
- The Red Fairy: Story of Lal Peri, a Muslim woman from the Indian state of Bihar who has made the Sufi Dargah of Lal Shahbaz Qalandar in Rural Sindh of Pakistan her home. Of the ongoing conflict of orthodox Islam with the more secular Sufism.
- The Monks Tale: Story of Tashi Passang, originally from Tibet but now living in the Indian town of Dharamsala after the Chinese captured Tibet. Of how it was difficult for a Monk to take up arms with the Tibetian resistance against the Chinese attack.
- The Maker of Idols: Story of Srikanda Stpaty, in the temple town of Swamimalai in Tamil Nadu who is the 23rd in the long hereditary line stretching back to the great bronze casters of the Chola empire.
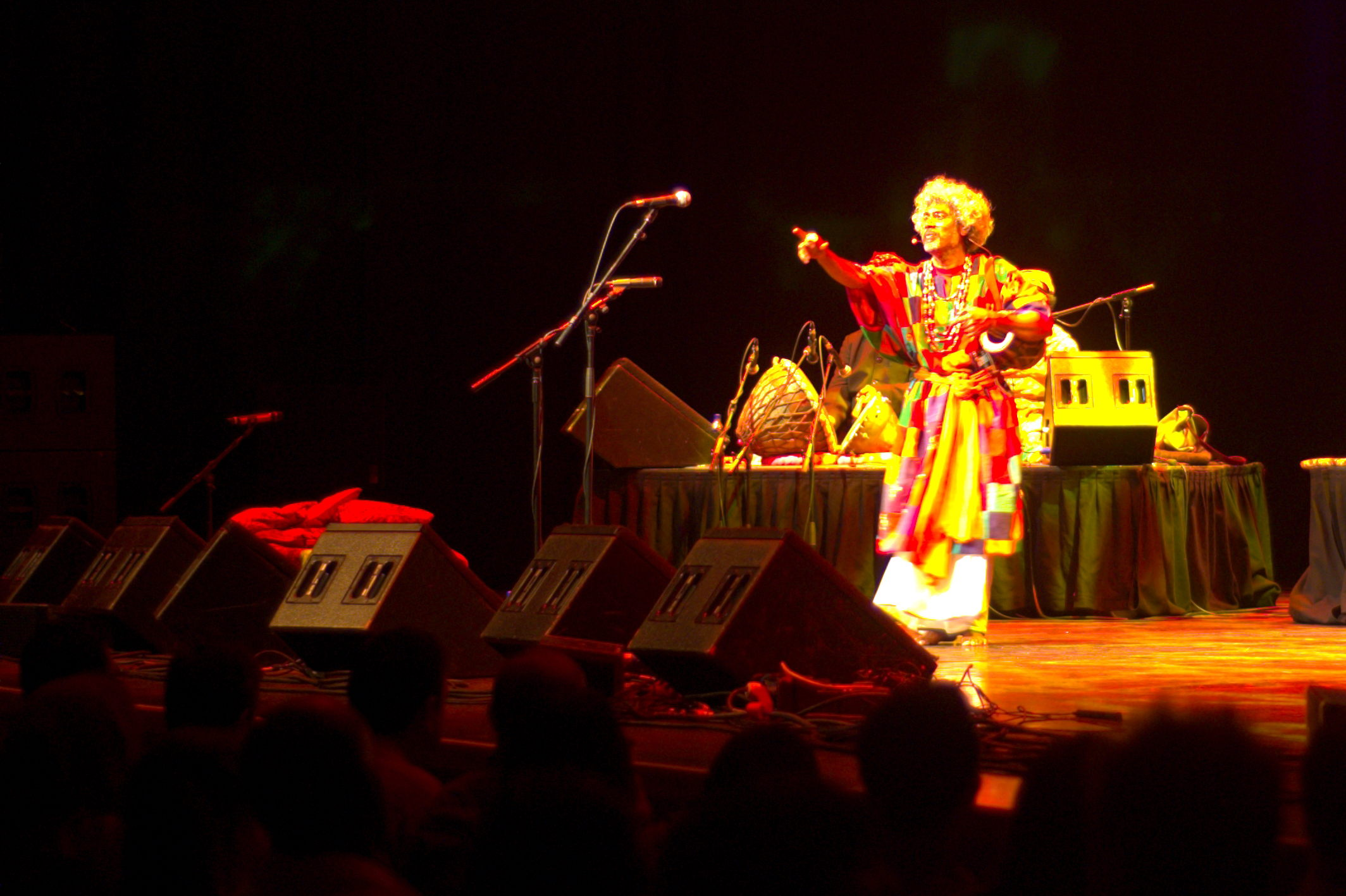
  Paban Das Baul at Nine Lives concert, 2009
- The Lady Twilight: Story of Manisha Ma Bhairavi, who lives in the holy town of Tarapith in West Bengal and worships goddess Tara. Of the Tantric traditions in Tarapith and the practices of storing and drinking from Human skull.
- The Song of the Blind Minstrel: Story of the wandering minstrels or Bauls, of Kanai Das and Debdas baul, of the singing Baul tradition and the annual baul festival at Kenduli in West Bengal.
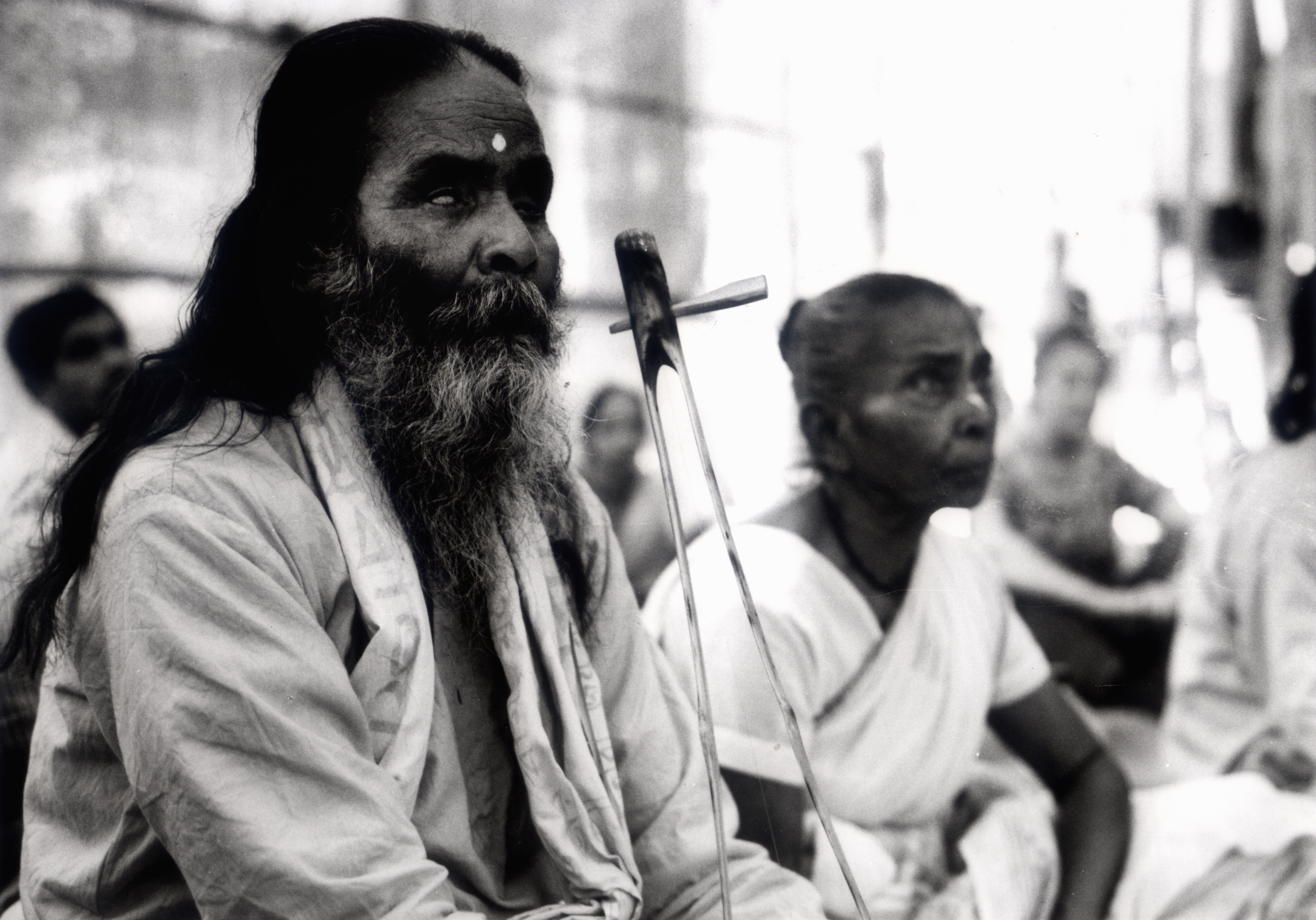
  Kanai Das Baul

For the launch of the book in India some of the characters in the book performed for the audience, with one of character's Hari Das from Kerala leading the Theyyam troupe and Paban Das Baul from Bengal leading the Baul singers.

== Critical response ==
The book was published by Bloomsbury to great acclaim, The Observer remarking that it "ranks with the very finest travel writing". On publication it went to the number one slot on the Indian non-fiction section best seller list. Hirsh Sawhney, writing in The Guardian, admires the book's "awareness of the world's innate cosmopolitanism" and "remarkably diverse array of characters". He calls Nine Lives a "compelling and poignant" work, but believes that Nine Lives does not challenge the partitioning of the world into "anachronistic, seemingly irreconcilable compartments" like the author's other works. Brian Schofield in The Sunday Times acknowledges the power and humanity of Dalrymple's portraits, calling them the work of "a towering talent" but also remarks on its narrow focus. In contrast, Pico Iyer, in TIME Magazine, praises the "powerful restraint and clarity" the book brings to "precisely the two subjects—India and faith—that cause most observers to fly off into cosmic vagueness or spleen. The result is a deeply respectful and sympathetic portrait." The distinguished Sanskritist Wendy Doniger also raved about the book in a cover story for the Times Literary Supplement: "Dalrymple vividly evokes the lives of these men and women, with the sharp eye and good writing that we have come to expect of his extraordinary travel books about India.. A glorious mixture of journalism, anthropology, history, and history of religions, written in prose worthy of a good novel, not since Kipling has anyone evoked village India so movingly. Dalrymple can conjure up a lush or parched landscape with a single sentence."

The book was long listed for the Samuel Johnson Prize 2010. It has received the 2010 Asia House Award for Asian Literature.
