= Talvin Singh =

British musician and producer (born 1970)

Talvin Singh OBE
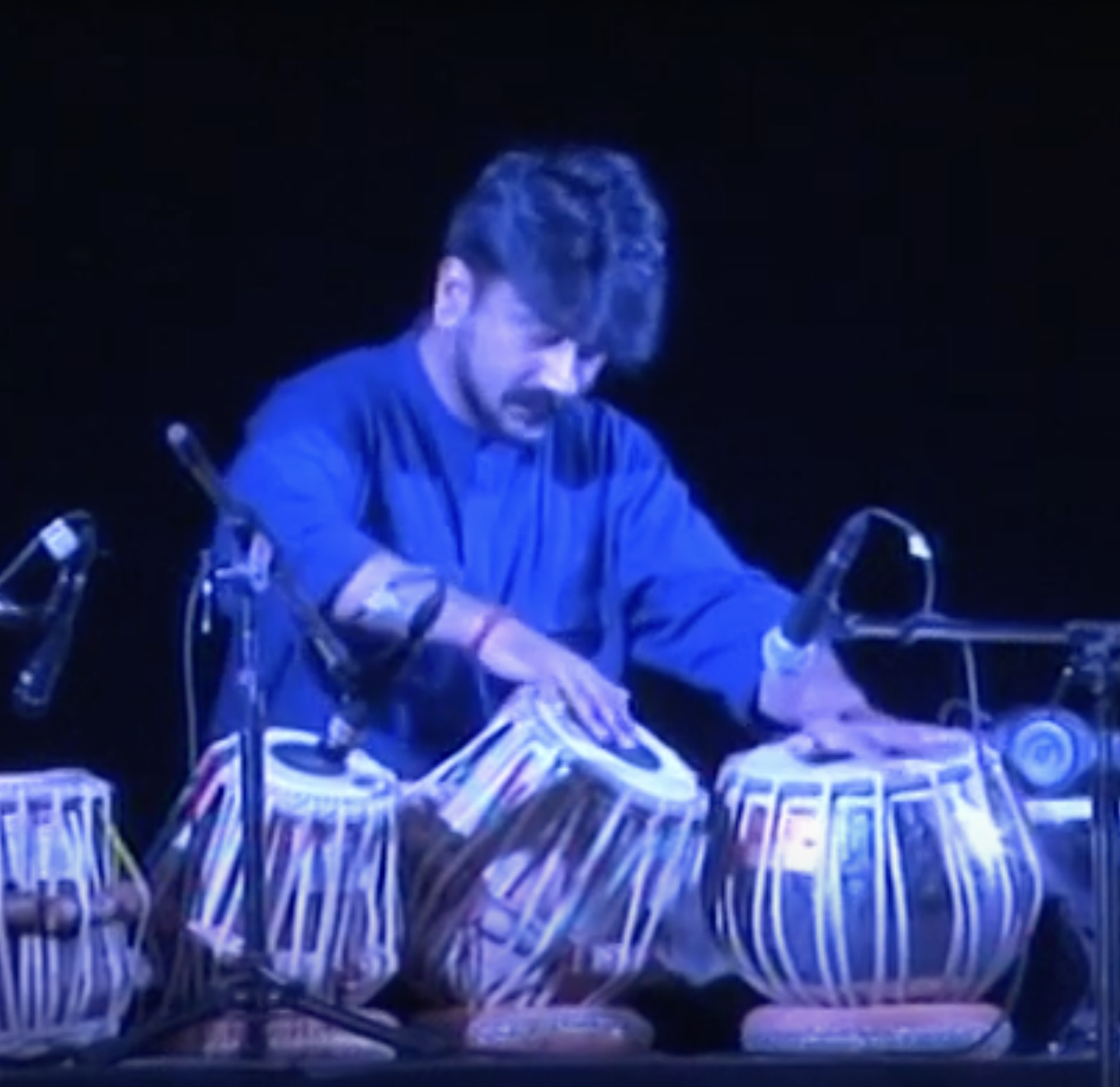
- Singh performing in 2012

Background information
- Also known as: Talvin Singh
- Born: Talvinder Singh Matharoo; 1970 (age 55–56); London, England
- Genres: Asian underground; electronica; drum and bass; Indian classical
- Occupations: Musician; Record Producer; Composer
- Instrument: Tabla
- Years active: 1991–present
- Label: Island
- Awards: Mercury Prize (1999); OBE (2014); Ivor Novello Award for Innovation (2022)
- Website: talvinsingh.com

Talvin Singh (born 1970) is a British Tabla player, musician, producer, and composer. Associated with the Asian Underground movement, his debut album, OK (1998), won the Mercury Music Prize in 1999. He was appointed an Officer of the Order of the British Empire (OBE) in the 2014 Birthday Honours for Services to Music. In 2022 he received the Ivor Novello Award for Innovation at The Ivor Composer Awards.

== Early life ==
Talvin Singh was born in Leytonstone, East London. His interest in Tabla began during childhood and he went to India at 16 to learn under Guru Ustad Lachman Singh Seen Punjab Gharana.

== Career ==
He collaborated with artists including Björk, Madonna Sun Ra, Massive Attack, Courtney Pine Blondie, and Siouxsie and the Banshees. Guy SigsworthJay-Z, Terry Riley, John Martyn, Yoko Ono, Courtney Pine, David Sylvian , Future Sound of London, The Indigo Girls, State of Bengal, Ustad Sultan Khan, Rakesh Chaurasia, Niladri Kumar.

Between 1996 and 1999, Talvin Singh, alongside creative producer Sweety Kapoor, and DJ/Music Producer Sam Zaman (aka State of Bengal), hosted Anokha Nights at The Blue Note Club in Hoxton Square, London, showcasing new fusion sounds from predominantly South Asian-Origin artists. In 1997, Talvin Singh released compilation album Anokha - Soundz of the Asian Underground.

In 1998, Talvin Singh released studio album, OK, which won Mercury Prize in 1999. The album took nine months. Traveling worldwide from collaborating with London MCs, folk singers in Okinawa Island Japan, Madras Philharmonic Orchestra in India. Ryuichi Sakamoto supported from the US.

In 2000, worked with Madonna on her eighth album Music. contributing as producer and musician with signature electronic ambient textures and Indian Classical Tabla to the sessions. credited on bonus track Cyber-Raga.

Talvin Singh collaborated and released album 'Vira' with Indian Classical Flautist Rakesh Chaurasia, Vira translates in Hindi as 'brotherhood' representing musical dialogue between two soloists. In 2012 he released Album 'Together' with Master Sitarist Niladri Kumar.

Talvin Singh contributed the track 'Jal' to the collaborative conservation album Simmerdim: Curlew Sounds, released April 29 2022. Project was organised by Merlyn Driver with support from the RSPB Charity, the album features diverse international musicians creating new music inspired by Eurasian Curlew to raise awareness for its conservation. Throughout he has supported charities including Saffron Hall Trust and Blind Children School in India.

=== Performances ===
Singh's first major tour was with Lollapalooza. This formed his vision for Tablatronics in the 1990s. Extensive touring continued worldwide to date. This included headlining a major electronic-fusion set at the Montreux Jazz Festival 2001 in Switzerland, performing live at the Miles Davis Hall. The line-up included vocalists Clevland Watkiss and Sagarika Mukherjee, blending heavy club baselines with hyper-speed Tabla improvisation. In 2014, he undertook the DEVI project via the Asian Art Agency, performing improvised live electronic and classical scores accompanying Satyajit Ray's arthouse classic film DEVI

In 2018 he performed at the Royal Festival Hall alongside pianist Guy Sigsworth, with full ensemble including flautist Sriram Sampath, Beat Box artist Jason Singh and a live string section. Here he reimagined his seminal, award-wining debut album OK, performing iconic tracks such as "Light".

In 2023 performances at South Bank Centre with fashion designer Nicholas Daley with Lucinda Chua and Cobey Sey titled Woven Rhythms. In 2026 at Southbank Centre Shradhanjali - Hommage to Zakir Hussain concert took place Talvin Singh featuring Drummer Marcus Gilmore, Ananthan Krishnan, Tom Rogerson and Satin Singh.

=== Composing for films and videos ===
Over the years Talvin Singh has composed music for films such as Mutiny: Asian Storm Music, Boom, The Republic of Love, På kanten af verden, Altitude 2005, Broken Eternity 2012, The Little Master 2015, Once Again 2018, Kekee Manzil House of Art 2022. Music videos he has been involved with include his own for "OK" in 1999 and Madonna's "Cyberraga" in 2000. In 2013 Talvin Singh partnered with BBC for a special feature titled "A musical journey through Mumbai" exploring soundscapes of vibrant streets.

== Style and influences ==
Talvin Singh style and Influence is rooted primarily from his Tabla teachings from his Guru Ustad Lachman Singh Seen.

Talvin Singh mission is to bring Tabla to the forefront and centre stage, as it has been viewed as a accompanying instrument to vocalists or instrumentalist rather than solo in Indian Classical Music.

With closeness to Indian classical music from a young age in the years 1980s to 1990s - learning, playing, listening or watching and developing interest in Jazz and Electronic music, early Electro, House and Jungle. he was inspired by the melting pot of sounds with different musical styles.

During his rigorous Tabla practices as a child he found metronome monotonous and boring and experimented playing Tabla to electro beats and recording from tape to tape, he began to practise with electro beats as a metronome instead, this is was the start of his musical style. In the 90s, through pairing Tabla percussion set via internal microphone with computers, processors and synthesizers. Talvin Singh was able to create experimental electronic music, drum and bass, ambient soundscapes and digital production which resulted in Tablatronics Talvin Singh style from Anokha Club Night in 1995, was ambient, trip hop beats, glitchy vibes and Indian Classical. Where Squarepusher and Black Star Liner would also come and play their set.

In a interview with The Times of India, he contested the term 'fusion music', stating that integrating Indian and Western musical traditions requires a formal understanding of both systems. Talvin Singh is "not a conventional composer" from a Western musical perspective, but rooted in Indian classical and oral traditions rather than manuscript-based composition.

Talvin Singh recalls receiving guidance from Academy Award-winning Ryuichi Sakamoto when composing his first full-length film and recalled his crucial mentoring that helped navigate the complex world of scoring moving images.

In 2021 via Indie Music Film Fest 2021 Talvin Singh shared his spiritual journey to Amarkantak in documentary Searching for Narmada. In this, he discussed being influenced by spiritual and sound healing energy of Indian Classical Music and demonstrated through Tabla and Surbahar his creative process of creating his musical compositions.

== Awards ==
Talvin Singh received the Mercury Prize in 1999 for the album OK. He was appointed OBE in the 2014 Birthday Honours for services to music and received the Ivor Novello Award for Innovation in 2022.

== Discography ==
=== Albums ===
- Drum + Space (as Calcutta Cyber Café) (1996)
- OK (1998)
- Ha (2001)
- Vira (2001)
- Sweet Box (2008)
- OK (Expanded Edition) (2009)

=== Compilations ===
- Anokha - Soundz of the Asian Underground (1997) Island
- Back to Mine, Volume 8 (2001) DMC

=== Collaborations and original contributions ===
- Siouxsie and the Banshees, "Kiss Them for Me" and "Silver Waterfalls" on Superstition (1991)
- Keith LeBlanc, Time Traveller (1992)
- Dub Syndicate, Live at the Town and Country Club
- Björk, Debut (1993)
- Abracatabla (1994) Sampling CD (time and Space)
- The Future Sound of London, "Life Form Ends" on Lifeforms (1994)
- Little Axe – The Wolf That House Built (1994)
- Bim Sherman – Miracle (1996)
- Nusrat Fateh Ali Khan – Star Rise (1997), Real World
- Duran Duran, "Out of My Mind", Medazzaland and The Saint (1997)
- David Sylvian – Dead Bees on a Cake (1999)
- Madonna – "Cyber-Raga", Music (2000)
- Master Musicians of Jajouka (2000)
- Randall & Hopkirk (Deceased) – Original soundtrack (2000) Island.
- Remixsingh Ok (2001) Island / Japan Import.
- Voxygen, a commission by English National Opera.
- Talvin Singh & Rakesh Chaurasia – Vira (2002) Sona Rupa UK.
- Tabla Beat Science – Tala Matrix (2002) Palm Pictures.
- Richard Ashcroft – Human Conditions (2002)
- Msoke – Murder Time (2003) Buback
- Talvin Singh & Sangat – Songs for the Inner World (2004) Live French Import.
- Talvin Singh feat. Amar-Jaan
- Smadj – Selin (2009)
- Talvin Singh & Niladri Kumar – Together (2011)
- "D.U.S.T." – Talvin Singh feat. Frame/Frame (2014)

=== Remixes ===
- Björk – "Possibly Maybe" (1996)
- Blondie – "Maria" (1999)
- Madonna – "Nothing Really Matters" (1999)
- Najma Akhtar – "Ghoom Charakhana"
- Ryuichi Sakamoto – "Grief"
- John Martyn – "Sunshines Better"
- Sarah McLachlan – "Answer"
- Natacha Atlas – "Duden"
- Asa-Chang & Junray – "12 Bushi"
- Alisha's Attic – "Air We Breathe"
- Najma Atish – "Ghoom Charakhana (Talvin Singh mix)"
- Bill Laswell and William S. Burroughs – "The Western Lands"
- Otm Shank – "Maharaja" (Talvin Singh Remix) (2021)
