= Vik Sharma =

English film and television composer

Vik Sharma is an English film and television composer best known for his soundtracks to the TV series An Idiot Abroad, The Moaning of Life, and Hello Ladies. He composed the original score for the film Fighting with My Family, written and directed by Stephen Merchant. Sharma worked with Blur's guitarist and founder member Graham Coxon along with Jason Cooper of The Cure to create a 'quintessentially British' soundtrack for the film. In July 2021 he released Listen Without Listening, a binaural ambient album, incorporating sounds of nature.

== Career ==
In 1997, Sharma joined Asian Underground collective Joi, contributing electric guitar and bass on their 1999 album, One and One is One, released on Peter Gabriel's Real World Records.

From 2010, Sharma composed the soundtrack for three series of the television programme, An Idiot Abroad, which featured Karl Pilkington, Stephen Merchant and Ricky Gervais, and a spin-off series, The Moaning of Life. Both shows engendered a cult following. 'Constantly hilarious... part travelogue, part social experiment, part practical joke, 'An Idiot Abroad' is easily the best thing you'll ever see on a Saturday night for seven weeks'.

In 2013 and 2014, Sharma composed the music for Hello Ladies, an American series and feature film created by Stephen Merchant for the network HBO. The soundtrack references the blue-eyed soul of the 1970s and 1980s.

Sharma collaborated with Merchant again, as he wrote an original score for Merchant's Fighting with My Family, described as "a movie that puts your heart in a headlock." The story centres around a real-life family of professional wrestlers, with Florence Pugh starring as WWE professional wrestler Paige and Dwayne "The Rock" Johnson as himself.

Sharma provided the soundtrack for the International Emmy award-winning comedy Hoff the Record, starring the actor David Hasselhof as himself.

Sharma has previously composed incidental and title music for Channel 4 documentary series The Undateables, Mary Queen of Frocks (presented by Mary Portas), The World's... and Me, Bleach, Nip, Tuck : The White Beauty Myth, What's Killing Darcus Howe?, The Family: Teen Stories and a short starring Christopher Eccleston entitled The Happiness Salesman.

Sharma was a contributor to The Steve Show, Stephen Merchant's Sunday afternoon BBC Radio 6 Music radio show.

The album Listen Without Listening was released in 2021, is an ambient exploration into the perception and representation of space and place- experimenting with the enhancement of listener mood using binaural recordings of sounds of nature.
