= Abhishek Raghuram =

Background information
- Born: 26 September 1985; India
- Origin: India
- Genre: Indian classical music
- Occupation: Classical Vocalist
- Years active: 2001–present

Abhishek Raghuram (born 1985) is an Indian carnatic vocalist.

== Life ==
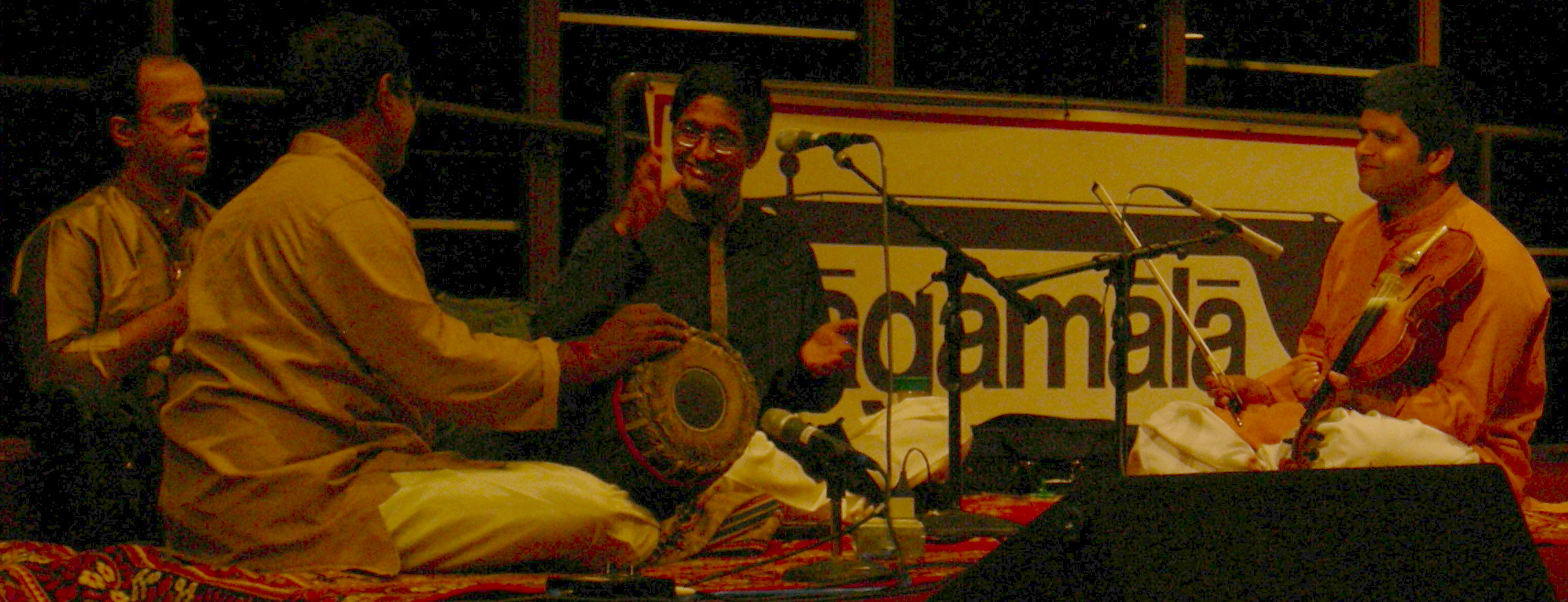
Abhishek Raghuram

Abhishek was born into a family of notable musicians. He is the grandson of mridangam maestro Palghat R. Raghu. His mother, Usha, is the niece of violin maestro Lalgudi Jayaraman. Veena exponent Jayanthi Kumaresh is his mother's sister. Mridangam exponent Anantha R. Krishnan, another grandson of Palghat R. Raghu, is his cousin. Ghazal and playback singer Hariharan (singer) is a relative on his father's side.

Abhishek started out as a mridangam player under the tutelage of his grandfather Palghat R. Raghu, but later, on his grandmother's insistence, he went for vocal training. Initially he trained under his mother, Usha. From 1994, he began taking lessons from P. S. Narayanaswamy. After completing his BSc in mathematics from Ramakrishna Mission Vivekananda College, he joined Anna University for his master's in computer science but later abandoned it to pursue music.

He has performed with musicians such as T. K. Murthy, Umayalpuram K. Sivaraman, Karaikudi Mani, Trichy Sankaran, G. Harishankar, Thiruvarur Bakthavathsalam, Ganesh and Kumaresh, the Mysore brothers, Jayateerth Mevundi, Mahesh Kale, and Sanjeev Abhyankar. He considers mandolin maestro U. Srinivas to have had the greatest influence on his sense of Carnatic music.

In the year 2014, Abhishek directed the Children's Carnatic choir organized by the Bhoomija trust as a fund-raiser for Drishti Eye Care, Bangalore, and it was presented by Zakir Hussain in the "Barsi" festival dedicated to his father, Alla Rakha.

Abhishek was involved in the making of the album Kaadalan Bharathi, composed of songs of Subramanya Bharati's, and also gave a mridangam recital along with Anantha R Krishnan for the 70th birthday celebrations of Karaikudi Mani.

Since 2012, Abhishek has been an "A" grade artist of All India Radio. In 2017, he performed at the Metropolitan Museum of Art in New York during the exhibition 'Modernism on the Ganges' at the Met Breuer celebrating the work of the Indian photographer Raghubir Singh.

== Awards ==
Abhishek has won several prizes in the competitions conducted by the Madras Music Academy, Narada Gana Sabha, Mylapore Fine Arts Club, Tyaga Brahma Gana Sabha, and others. He won his first prize, a gold medal awarded by Ananda Vikatan, at the age of seven, for his mridangam playing in the all-India Mazhalai Medhai contest. He also won a first prize in the Pallavi singing competition organized by the S. Balachander Trust in 1996.

- Best concert in the Spirit of Youth concert series conducted by the Music Academy in 1997.
- 'Most Inspiring Youth Artist' Best Junior Vocalist – The Music Academy, Madras, in Dec. 1999
- 'Asthana Vidwan' title from the Kanchi Kamakoti Peetam in October 2006
- 'Yagnaraman Youth Excellence Award' by Sri Krishna Gana Sabha, Chennai, in July 2009
- 'Shanmukha Sangeetha Shironmani Award' by Shanmukhananda Sangeetha Sabha, Mumbai, in December 2009
- Sangeet Natak Akademi’s Ustad Bismillah Khan Yuva Puraskar 2013
- 'Yogam Nagaswami Award' for Best Senior Vocalist – Madras Music Academy, December Season 2013-14
- 'Sangeetha Choodamani Award'- Krishna Gana Sabha
