= Honey and Dust =

2007 book by Piers Moore Ede

- Author: Piers Ede

Honey and Dust is the first book by Piers Moore Ede, British born writer. It won the D. H. Lawrence Prize for non fiction 2007 and is published by Bloomsbury.

It is an account of the author's recovery from serious injury and his subsequent travels in search of wild honey.

After being seriously injured in a hit-and-run cycling accident, Piers Moore Ede goes to an organic farm in Italy to recuperate. There, he becomes interested in the work of the beekeeper owner and in honey. He sets off travelling in search of the most wonderful honeys in the world, going to Lebanon, Syria, Sri Lanka, India, and most notably Nepal, where he accompanies the Gurung tribesmen as they collect wild honey from cliffs. The book describes the author's own restorative journey and the development of his ecological vision as he researches the dwindling traditions of the honey-farmers.
