= D-Code =

- Genres: Drum & bass, punk, alternative, electronica
- Occupation(s): Producer, DJ, Musician
- Labels: Shiva Soundsystem, Terrafunk

D-Code is a British DJ. After beginning as a DJ on pirate radio in London, he became a record producer. In 2005, he became acquainted with Nerm, the founder of Shiva Soundsystem, releasing his first record on the label in 2006 and recording with the collective. He has toured internationally and featured on radio, including BBC Radio 1. He was a featured artist on the 2009 video game DJ Hero.
