= Aref Durvesh =

British tabla player

Aref Durvesh is a British tabla artist who has recorded and performed with Badmarsh & Shri, Sting, Susheela Raman, Cheb Mami, Jeff Beck, Visionary Underground, and is also one of the longest-serving members of Nitin Sawhney's band, having performed on all of his albums as well as all his UK and international tours.

== Biography ==
Durvesh is from London. His father was a musician, a disciple of Bismillah Khansahib, and a world-renowned shehnai player. Durvesh grew up with Indian music and developed an interest in tabla. He integrates traditional tabla performance into contemporary urban music, jazz, hip hop and fusion, as well as being a virtuoso in the traditional skills. He extends this to producing his own album and performing live under his own name, while continuing to tour with Nitin and Shusheela.

Aref has appeared twice at the prestigious Mercury Awards for Music, firstly with Nitin and again with Susheela Raman.

Aref is currently working with Xkollective (Xfile Productions), The Nasha Experience, Mo Magic, Susheela Raman, Nitin Sawhney and Sonic Devis.
