= Paban Das Baul =

Indian musical artist

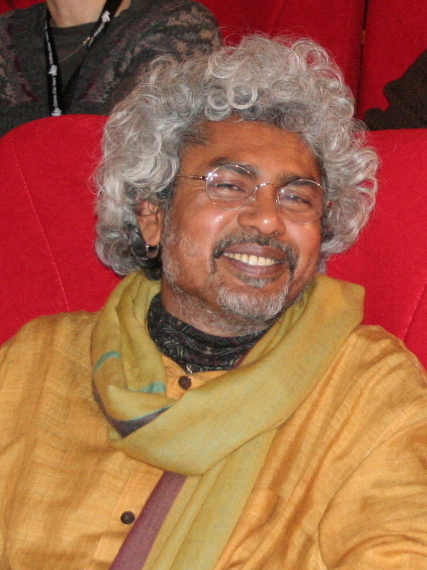
- Paban Das Baul at Festival international des cinémas d'Asie de Vesoul 2009

Background information
- Born: Paban Das; 1961 (age 64–65); Mohammedpur, Murshidabad district, West Bengal, India
- Genres: Baul music, folk-fusion
- Occupations: Singer, composer
- Instruments: Dugdugi; Ektara
- Years active: 1970s–present
- Labels: Real World Records; Fonti Musicali

Paban Das Baul (born 1961) is a noted Baul singer and musician from India, who also plays a dubki, a small tambourine and sometimes an ektara as an accompaniment. He is known for pioneering traditional Baul music on the international music scene and for establishing a genre of folk-fusion music.

== Early life ==
Born in Mohammedpur, a small village in the Murshidabad district of West Bengal, where his early musical influences were his father, and wandering baul singers.

== Career ==
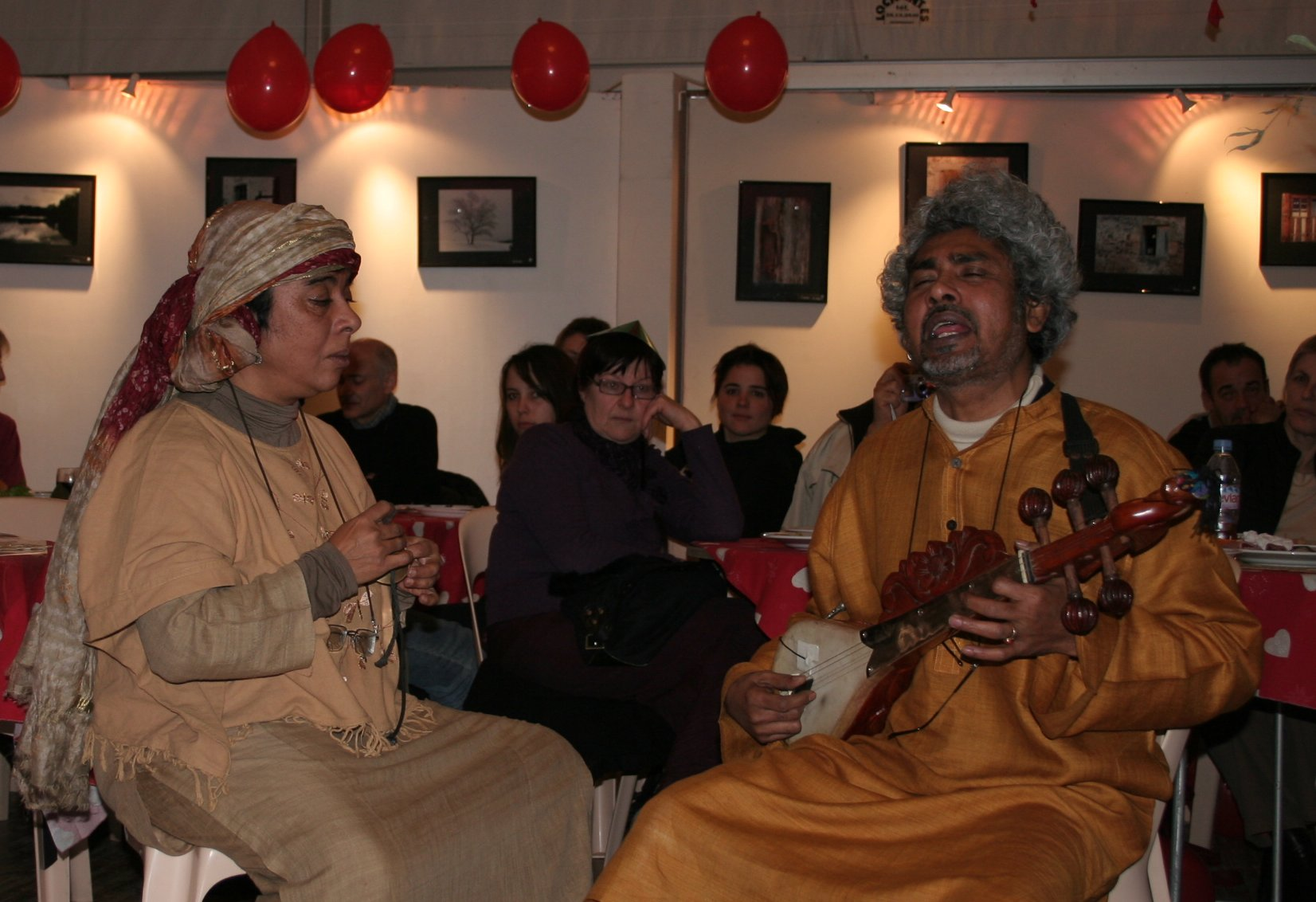
Mimlu Sen and Paban Das Baul, Baul musicians, at International Asian Movies festival in Vesoul, France

In 1988, Das Baul started collaborating with Sam Mills, a London-born guitarist who had performed with experimental, avant garde group 23 Skidoo between 1979 and 1982. Their collaboration resulted in the acclaimed album Real Sugar (1997), a Peter Gabriel's Real World Records release, it marked one of the first fusions of Bengali music and Western pop music. The album features psychedelic elements to it and has been compared to the work of artists such as George Harrison, Ananda Shankar and The Bombay Royale. He has also collaborated with the London-based State of Bengal and Susheela Raman. In 2005, the Baul tradition was included in the list of "Masterpieces of the Oral and Intangible Heritage of Humanity" by UNESCO.

He also performed at the Jaipur Literature Festival and the "Nine Lives" Concert, 2009 in London, of William Dalrymple.

== Personal life ==
He met Mimlu as a concert audience in 1982 in Paris, they later married and lived in Paris for many years. He has taught himself to read, not just Bengali, but Hindi, English and French.

== Discography ==
Solo albums

- Inner Knowledge (1997)
- Music of the Honey Gatherers (2010)

Collaboration albums

- Real Sugar (1997, with Sam Mills)
- Le Chant Des Bauls - Manuche O Rautan (2002, with various artists)
- Tana Tani (2004, with State of Bengal)

== Filmography ==
- Nagmoti (1983) (as performer at song "Doriyay Ailo Tufan")
- Shukno Lanka (2010) (as performer at song "Sundori Komola")
- Hunger & Love: Tobu O Bhalobasha (2017) (as composer)
