= Ha (Talvin Singh album) =

Studio album by Talvin Singh
- Released: 4 April 2001
- Genre: Drum and bass; trip hop
- Length: 73:20
- Label: Island
- Producer: Talvin Singh

Talvin Singh chronology
OK (1998)	Ha (2001)	Vira (2001)

Professional ratings
Review scores
Source	Rating
AllMusic	2/5 stars

Ha is the second studio album by English record producer Talvin Singh, released on Island Records in 2001. It peaked at number 57 on the UK Albums Chart.

== Track listing ==
Ha track listing
No.	Title	Length
1.	"One"	12:52
2.	"Mustard Fields"	8:20
3.	"The Beat Goes On"	5:34
4.	"Uphold"	4:46
5.	"Sway of the Verses"	6:02
6.	"Dubla"	5:06
7.	"It's Not Over"	7:45
8.	"Abalonia"	6:56
9.	"See Breeze"	4:52
10.	"Bobby Style"	7:11
11.	"Silver Flowers"	4:44

== Charts ==
Chart performance for Ha
Chart (2001)	Peak position
Australian Albums (ARIA)	71
French Albums (SNEP)	122
Swiss Albums (Schweizer Hitparade)	88
UK Albums (OCC)	57
