= Anantha R. Krishnan =

Indian-American musician

- Anantha R. Krishnan performing on the mridangam

Background information
- Born: 27 April 1983 (age 43); Chennai, Tamil Nadu, India
- Genres: Carnatic, world music
- Years active: 1991–present

Anantha R. Krishnan is a Carnatic mridangam artist, composer and educator.

== Early life and training ==
Krishnan began learning the mridangam at age five under his maternal uncle, R. Ramkumar, and his grandfather, the mridangam maestro Palghat R. Raghu. Carnatic vocalist Abhishek Raghuram, another grandson of Palghat R. Raghu, is his cousin. On his paternal side, Krishnan is the grandson of A. Anantaraman, who hails from the sishya parampara of Muthuswami Dikshitar and was the principal founder of Guruguha Gana Vidyalaya in Kolkata.

He performed his first concert at age seven, and by age 20, he had shared the stage with prominent Indian classical musicians including M. Balamuralikrishna, Hariprasad Chaurasia, T. N. Krishnan, K. J. Yesudas, and Mandolin U. Srinivas. He studies tabla under Ustad Zakir Hussain.

His early achievements include receiving the State of the Arts Award from the New Jersey government in 1997 and 1998.

== Performance career ==
His international performance career includes appearances at the Millennium celebrations at Haus der Kulturen der Welt in Berlin in 1999, EXPO 2000 in Hanover, and SWR 2's New Jazz Meeting in Baden-Baden in 2006 with Fred Frith's Clearing Customs. As a member of Rudresh Mahanthappa's group, Samdhi, he performed at the Festival of the Firsts in Pittsburgh in 2007, the North Sea Jazz Festival in Rotterdam in 2011, and Carnegie Hall's Shape of Jazz series.

From 2016, Krishnan was a part of Ustad Zakir Hussain's Masters of Percussion ensemble, with performances at the National Centre for the Performing Arts in Mumbai, Sanders Theatre at Harvard University, the Kennedy Center, Muziekgebouw in Amsterdam, and a special performance for India and Nepal's 75th Year Diplomatic Relations.

In 2017 summer, he was part of "Classical Music of India and Pakistan" music night at the BBC proms at Royal Albert Hall.

In January 2020, Krishnan, along with music producer Viveick Rajagopalan, started Mridangamela, a festival centered around the theme of the mridangam, which premiered at the Royal Opera House, Mumbai.

In November 2022, he was invited as a special guest for the band Clearing Customs, led by Fred Frith, at the Zollverein.

Krishnan has also performed as part of Two Summ, a band with Viveick Rajagopalan, at the Mahindra Percussion Festival in 2024.

In September 2025, Krishnan was invited as an alumnus of the Dartmouth College Music Department to perform at the Collis Common Ground with Charumathi Raghuraman and Giridhar Udupa.

He was invited as a featured performer in commemoration of Ustad Zakir Hussain's 75th birthday celebration at Carnegie Hall in New York on March 6, 2026. In July 2026, he was invited to perform with Talvin Singh at Queen Elizabeth Hall as part of Asian Arts Agency's Shraddhanjali, a memorial concert for Zakir Hussain.

== Discography ==
- Mridangam & Life
- Mr̥daṅgaŚravas
- We Are - Two Summ
- Tranquility
- Clearing Customs

== Awards ==
Ustad Bismillah Khan Yuva Puraskar from the Sangeet Natak Akademi, Delhi.
