= Gour Khyapa =

Gour Khyapa গৌর ক্ষ্যাপা
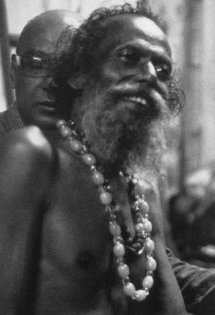

Background information
- Born: August 15, 1947; Birbhum, India
- Died: January 26, 2013 (aged 65); West Bengal, India
- Genres: Baul music, folk
- Occupations: singer; philosopher; musician
- Instrument: vocal
- Labels: Fonti Musicali

Gour Khyapa (15 August 1947 – 26 January 2013) was a Bengali Baul singer and a philosopher. His philosophy was related to Tattva. He was famous for his songs related to Radha-Krishna. He taught philosophy at Vassar and Brown University.

== Music ==
He performed alongside Bob Dylan, Bob Marley and Janis Joplin at various concerts. He also worked with Jerzy Grotowski, a Polish theatre director and theorist. He refused to visit the United States to perform in Peter Brook’s 1989 film The Mahabharata, when told he couldn’t legally carry hemp with him.

== Death and legacy ==
On 22 January 2013, he was hospitalised after a street accident at Ilambazar near Shantiniketan. He died on 26 January 2013. He is survived by his wife Parvati and daughter Lakshmi. He has only one disciple, Sanat Das Baul. On 15 September 2019 Indian politician and current Chief Minister of West Bengal Mamata Banerjee homage to Gour Khyapa on Twitter.

== Discography ==
Collaboration albums

- Le Chant Des Bauls - Manuche O Rautan (2002, with various artists)
