= Sometimes It Snows in April =

1986 song by Prince and The Revolution

Song by Prince and the Revolution

from the album Parade
- Released: 1986
- Recorded: April 21, 1985
- Studio: Sunset Sound Studios (Hollywood, California); Monterey Sound Studios (Glendale, California)
- Genre: Pop; soul
- Length: 6:48
- Label: Paisley Park; Warner Bros.
- Songwriters: Prince; Wendy & Lisa
- Producer: Prince

"Sometimes It Snows in April" is a song by American musician Prince. It was included on his eighth studio album Parade, which was also the soundtrack to his film Under the Cherry Moon (1986). Prince wrote, performed, and produced the song alongside Wendy & Lisa, who co-wrote the music.

The song's narrator recounts memories of Christopher Tracy, Prince's character from Under the Cherry Moon, and how Tracy's death affected the narrator; it also expresses their desire to hopefully rejoin Tracy in heaven. Prince performed the song live fairly often over the years, sometimes using it as a final encore to wind down the show.

"Sometimes It Snows in April" received significant attention after Prince's death on April 21, 2016, exactly 31 years after its recording date, and it went on to re-enter several record charts worldwide.

== Commercial performance ==
After the initial release of Parade, "Sometimes It Snows in April" was not released as a single, which made it ineligible to chart. However, after Prince's death on April 21, 2016, sales of the song increased heavily, allowing it to peak on several charts. The song was most successful in Europe; in France, it peaked at number 14, lasting a total of three weeks on the chart. It fared well in the Netherlands, Austria, and Switzerland, where it peaked at numbers 63, 69, and 64, respectively. It charted the lowest in the United Kingdom, where it lasted for one week on the chart, peaking at number 193.

== Personnel ==
Credits from Duane Tudahl, Benoît Clerc and Guitarcloud

- Prince – lead vocals
- Lisa Coleman – piano, backing vocals
- Wendy Melvoin – acoustic guitar, backing vocals

== Charts ==
Chart performance for "Sometimes It Snows in April"
Chart (2016)	Peak position
Austria (Ö3 Austria Top 40)	69
France (SNEP)	14
Netherlands (Single Top 100)	63
Switzerland (Schweizer Hitparade)	64
UK Singles (Official Charts)	193

== Amar version ==
British Indian singer Amar recorded a cover version of the song for her album Outside. It was released as a single on 12 June 2000, and peaked at No. 48 on the UK Singles Chart. It also reached No. 6 on the UK Dance Singles Chart, due to the popular UK garage remix by Dreem House, the "Dreem House Dub Mix".

Mixmag included the Dreem House remix of "Sometimes It Snows in April" in their list of "40 of the best UK garage tracks released from 1995 to 2005".

Gemtracks included the Dreem House remix of the song in their list of the "top UK garage songs between 1995–2005".

Chart performance for "Sometimes It Snows in April" by Amar
Chart (2000)	Peak position
UK Singles (Official Charts)	48
UK Dance Singles (Official Charts Company)	6

== Other cover versions ==
French R&B duo Native recorded a cover version of the song for their self-titled debut album, released in 1995. The single peaked at number 49 on the French Singles Chart.

Shawn Smith, from the bands Brad and Satchel, released a live version on his 2000 album Live at the Point. The record was recorded at The Point in Philadelphia on September 30, 1999, and was considered by Smith as one of his best vocal performances.

Australian musician Gotye recorded an acapella cover version of the song that was uploaded to his YouTube channel on April 21, 2016, the same day that Prince died.

American musician D'Angelo performed the song as a tribute to Prince, accompanied by Maya Rudolph and Gretchen Lieberum of the Prince cover band Princess, on April 26, 2016 on The Tonight Show Starring Jimmy Fallon.

British band Coldplay performed a live cover of the song, accompanied by fellow British singer-songwriter Lianne La Havas, on July 6, 2016 in Copenhagen, Denmark while on tour for their album A Head Full of Dreams.

Barry Hyde, the former frontman of the Futureheads, recorded a cover version of the song for his solo album Malody, released in June 2016.

American musician Meshell Ndegeocello recorded a cover version of the song for her album Ventriloquism, released on March 16, 2018.

In 2019, Sandra Bernhard performed the song in character as Judy in the episode "Love's in Need of Love Today" on the FX series Pose. This version was released as a single on the episode's air date of July 23, 2019.
