= Piers Moore Ede =

British writer

Piers Moore Ede is a British born writer, with a travel book Honey and Dust published by Bloomsbury in 2005.

Born in 1975, he was educated at Winchester College, Exeter University and the University of California, Santa Cruz. While living in San Francisco he was involved in a hit and run accident, during the recovery from which he conceived of his first travel book, a global adventure in search of wild honey. Honey and Dust documents his search for wholeness, while looking for the last of the tribes that still hunt wild honey in jungles and cliffs. He visits Bedouin tribesman in the Syrian desert, Gurung mountain people in Nepal, the Veddhas or Wild Men in Sri Lanka, and even a rooftop beekeeper on the skyscrapers of Manhattan.

Honey and Dust won the non fiction category of the DH Lawrence prize, and was nominated for the Jeremy Round first book award with the British Guild of Food Writers.

His second book All Kinds of Magic was published by Bloomsbury in 2010, recounting a journey round India in search of mystical experience. Drawing comparisons to In Search of Sacred India by Paul Brunton this modern spiritual travelogue was praised by Tahir Shah, Justine Hardy and Isabel Losada and includes a visit to the Ramana Maharshi ashram in Tiruvanamalai, India.

He is also a photographer and blues guitarist, and holds regular exhibitions of his work in London.
