= Inner Knowledge =

Studio album by Paban Das Baul
- Released: 4 November 1997
- Recorded: 1995
- Venues: Real World Studios, England
- Studio: Real World Studios
- Genres: folk; world; country
- Length: 66:27
- Label: Real World Records
- Producer: Michael Brook

Paban Das Baul chronology
Inner Knowledge (1997)	Music of the Honey Gatherers (2010)

Inner Knowledge is the debut solo studio album by Bengali Baul singer and musician Paban Das Baul. The album was released in the United Kingdom on 4 November 1997 by Real World Records and was produced by Michael Brook.

== Production and recording ==
The tracks used for the album were recorded in 1995 recording week at Real World Studios in England.

== Release and reception ==
Professional ratings
Review scores
Source	Rating
AllMusic	3/5 stars

The album was released in the United Kingdom on 4 November 1997 by Real World Records. The album was re-released on 4 December 2006 by Womad Select.

== Track listing ==
No.	Title	Length
1.	"Paramey Param" (Bliss)	05:19
2.	"Nodi Bhora" (River Full of Waves)	06:45
3.	"Premer Iskuley" (School of Love)	06:40
4.	"Gour Milena" (Holy Marks)	05:01
5.	"Dhire Dhire" (Row Your Boat Steadily)	08:53
6.	"Gharer Karigar" (Your Architect is Inside You)	10:34
7.	"Sahajey Pagol" (Easily Mad)	05:27
8.	"Khejur Gachey Hari" (Tie My Spirit to the Date Palm Tree)	08:01
9.	"Mojar Karkhana" (Strange Factory)	09:47
Total length:		66:27

== Personnel ==
Adapted from the 1997 release

- Paban Das Baul – lead vocals, khamak, dotara, dubki
- Subal Das Baul – vocals
- Nitya Gopal Das – vocals, dotara, khamak
- Tinkori Chakravarty – dubki
- Mimlu Sen – ektara, cymbals

Additional personnel

- Ben Findlay – recorded and mixed (all but 5)
- Tchad Blake – recorded and mixed (5)
- Anna-Karin Sundin – Graphic design
- Carlos Muñoz-Yagüe – photography
- Vince Goodsell – instruments photography
- Stephen Lovell-Davis – the front cover, back inlay photography
- Mimlu Sen – sleeve notes
