= OK (Talvin Singh album) =

1998 studio album by Talvin Singh

Studio album by Talvin Singh
- Released: 9 November 1998
- Genre: Electronica; indian classical; exotica
- Length: 60:48
- Label: Island
- Producer: Talvin Singh

Talvin Singh chronology
OK (1998)	Ha (2001)

OK is the debut studio album by English / Indian tabla player and record producer Talvin Singh, released on Island Records in 1998. It won him the Mercury Prize for 1999. The record was included in the book 1001 Albums You Must Hear Before You Die. It took nine months of travelling around and recording to complete the album. Singh recorded in London and on Okinawa Island to capture folk singers, as well as in India to collaborate with the Madras Philharmonic Orchestra.

Singh hired various collaborators, including guitarist Jon Klein, with whom he had previously recorded on Siouxsie and the Banshees's single "Kiss Them for Me" and toured during the inaugural Lollapalooza festival. Ryuichi Sakamoto played flute on the album and sent his parts via a computer with an email which was a first in the late 1990s. Rakesh Chaurasia also performed flute. Singh recruited an eight female singer choir for the song "Soni". Guy Sigsworth played keyboards on the opening track "Traveller", and also on "Sutrix" and the title track of the album. Vocalist Suchitra Pillai joined in for the song "Sutrix".

== Critical reception ==
Professional ratings
Review scores
Source	Rating
AllMusic	4/5 stars
Entertainment Weekly	B
The Guardian	4/5 stars
Los Angeles Times	3.5/4 stars
Muzik	4/5 stars
NME	8/10
Pitchfork	7.5/10
Rolling Stone	2/5 stars

In the NME, reviewer Christian Ward noted that Singh was "trying to cover the globe with his music", as a voice intones "The world is sound", at the start of the album. The record is rooted in India with odes to Asian underground scene, dub rhythms and jazz. There is also a contrast between "geisha choirs and cut-up beats", along with plaintive orchestral arrangements. Ward noted that "convulsive rhythms compete with sensuous strings to create a deep, dark atmosphere", concluding with this positive sentence, "There are still more sonic territories to explore, but on this evidence, it seems that Talvin Singh will get there first."

== Track listing ==
No.	Title	Length
1.	"Traveller"	11:18
2.	"Butterfly"	4:26
3.	"Sutrix"	5:55
4.	"Mombasstic"	5:45
5.	"Decca"	1:20
6.	"Eclipse"	5:50
7.	"OK"	4:19
8.	"Light"	6:23
9.	"Disser/Point.Mento.B"	2:43
10.	"Soni"	5:59
11.	"Vikram the Vampire"	6:47

Japanese edition bonus track
No.	Title	Length
12.	"Wrist Flick"	5:48

== Additional musicians Talvin collaborated with ==
- John Klein (guitar)
- Ryuichi Sakamoto (flute)
- Rakesh Chaurasia (flute)
- Guy Sigsworth (keyboards)
- Suchitra Pillai (vocals)

== Charts ==
Chart	Peak position
UK Albums (OCC)	41

== Certifications ==
Region	Certification	Certified units/sales
United Kingdom (BPI)	Silver	60,000^{^}
^{^} Shipments figures based on certification alone.
