= Music of the Honey Gatherers =

Studio album by Paban Das Baul
- Released: May 24, 2010
- Recorded: 2006, 2009
- Studio: Montreuil, Paris; Net Guru Studios, Kolkata; WAC Recording Studio, London
- Genre: folk; world; country
- Length: 54:08
- Label: Riverboat Records; World Music Network

Paban Das Baul chronology
| Inner Knowledge (1997) | Music of the Honey Gatherers (2010) |

Music of the Honey Gatherers is the second solo studio album by Bengali Baul singer and musician Paban Das Baul. The album was released in the United Kingdom on 24 May 2010 by Riverboat Records and World Music Network.

== Production and recording ==
The tracks used for the album took four years to complete. The album was worked on in London and Montreuil, France.The rest of the songs ware recorded at Net Guru Studios in Kolkata.

== Release and reception ==
Professional ratings
Review scores
| Source | Rating |
|---|---|
| AllMusic | 4/5 stars |

The album was released in the United Kingdom on 24 November 2010 by Riverboat Records a subsidiary of UK based music company World Music Network.

Evening Standard commented the album "...some of the most ecstatic and beguiling music in the world". Financial Times says that "about six minutes into "Prem Katha Ti Shunte Bhalo", limber drums suddenly kick in, and transcendence hovers."

== Track listing ==
All music is composed by Paban Das Baul

| No. | Title | Length |
|---|---|---|
| 1. | "Kaliya" |
| 2. | "Guru To Dayal" |
| 3. | "Gopon Prem" ("Secret Love") |
| 4. | "Pagla Ghora" |
| 5. | "Murshidi" ("Melody From The Baul Trail") |
| 6. | "Kala Re" |
| 7. | "Kon Ek Pakhi" |
| 8. | "Katha Kare Bolbo Ki" |
| 9. | "Shobure Mewa Pholey" |
| 10. | "Prem Katha Ti Shunte Bhalo" |
| Total length: | | 54:08 |
