= Asian Underground =

Music genre and scene

Asian underground is a term associated with South Asian diaspora musicians who blend elements of traditional South Asian music with contemporary electronic dance music. The genre originates from South Asians in the United Kingdom, so the term "Asian" in this context refers to South Asians. The movement includes British Asian, South Asian Canadian, South Asian American and Dutch South Asian musicians of mostly Indian, Pakistani, Bangladeshi and Sri Lankan descent.

The sound has roots in the South Asian diaspora, and many notable musicians within the genre are immigrants or children of immigrants. The first well-known mention was the compilation album Anokha - Soundz of the Asian Underground released in 1997 and masterminded by Talvin Singh and Sweety Kapoor. It is not a strict musical genre per se, since the specific sounds can vary wildly (from Cornershop's Bollywood-influenced Britpop to Panjabi MCs' bhangra-influenced jungle).

== History ==
In the 1980s, performances of folk music evolved into the bhangra music genre, which would later become more mainstream in the 1990s and 2000s.

In 1982, the album Punjabi Disco was produced by Kuljit Bhamra with vocals by his mother Mohinder Kaur Bhamra. It was the first album to combine bhangra with electronic dance music. It was produced using a Roland SH-1000 synthesizer and Roland Compurhythm CR-8000 drum machine. The album anticipated elements of acid house music while featuring elements of disco, funk and psychedelic music. The album was initially a commercial failure, but later developed a cult following after its rediscovery in the early 21st century, leading to a re-release in 2025.

In the 1990s, Asian underground was considered hip and broke through to the mainstream, with artists such as Apache Indian and Cornershop frequently entering the UK charts, with the former's "Boom Shack-A-Lak" (1993) appearing in many popular movies and the latter topping the charts with "Brimful of Asha" in 1998. UK Apache (Abdul Wahab) entered the UK charts with "Original Nuttah" (1994), one of the first mainstream jungle music hits.

The genre and other forms of South Asian music began to influence Europe's pop mainstream as acts like Björk, Erasure, and Siouxsie and the Banshees all released singles or remixes featuring South Asian instrumentation. Talvin Singh, known for his innovative fusion of Indian classical music with drum and bass, subsequently won a Mercury Music Prize for his album OK in 1999.

Asian underground music initially had only little influence on popular Indian music on the sub-continent, where it was usually branded under world music. In the 1990s, several Asian underground artists such as Apache Indian, Trickbaby and Bally Sagoo gained fame in India. After Panjabi MC's international hit "Mundian To Bach Ke" (1998), British-Asian underground music could compete with domestic Indian artists like Shankar Mahadevan and Remo Fernandes, in addition to attracting worldwide audiences. It was followed by the globally successful Rishi Rich Project, consisting of producer Rishi Rich and artists Jay Sean, Mumzy Stranger, Juggy D and Veronica Mehta. They were one of the first groups to fuse Bhangra music with contemporary R&B and found tremendous success in India after their songs were featured in mainstream Bollywood soundtracks such as Boom, Kya Kool Hai Hum and Hum Tum. Since then, Asian underground music has exerted some influence on mainstream Indian pop music.

Asian underground music has also influenced mainstream American hip hop, R&B and urban music in the 2000s, including artists such as Timbaland, Truth Hurts, Jay-Z, Snoop Dogg, Missy Elliott and Britney Spears. According to DJ Green Lantern, "Indian beats have now become a fixture on the R&B scene". Music produced by the Asian Dub Foundation has also been featured on the soundtracks for popular video games such as Need For Speed Underground. Several former Asian underground artists such as M.I.A. and Jay Sean have gone on to achieve mainstream success in the North American music industry, where they produced mainstream songs such as "Paper Planes" and "Down" that have charted highly on (and in the latter case, topped) the Billboard Hot 100.

== Primary instruments ==
Asian underground uses many traditional and relatively new instruments. Its primary ones are sitar and tabla, and almost all artists use an electronic or acoustic drum kit and/or synthesizer. Some groups like Tabla Beat Science use an electric bass. Various other instruments, including the dholak, sarangi, and bansuri are also sometimes used. Vocals can be found as an instrument of emotional expression on many Asian underground recordings.

== Notable labels ==
- Axiom Records
- Nation Records
- Shiva Soundsystem
- Six Degrees Records

== Notable compilations ==
- Anokha - Soundz of the Asian Underground
- Eastern Uprising - Music from the Asian Underground, compiled by Earthtribe, released on Sony/Higherground
- Indian Electronica volume 001, compiled by Qasim Virjee a.k.a. Abdul Smooth

== See also ==
- World fusion music
