= Susheela Raman =

British musician (born 1973)

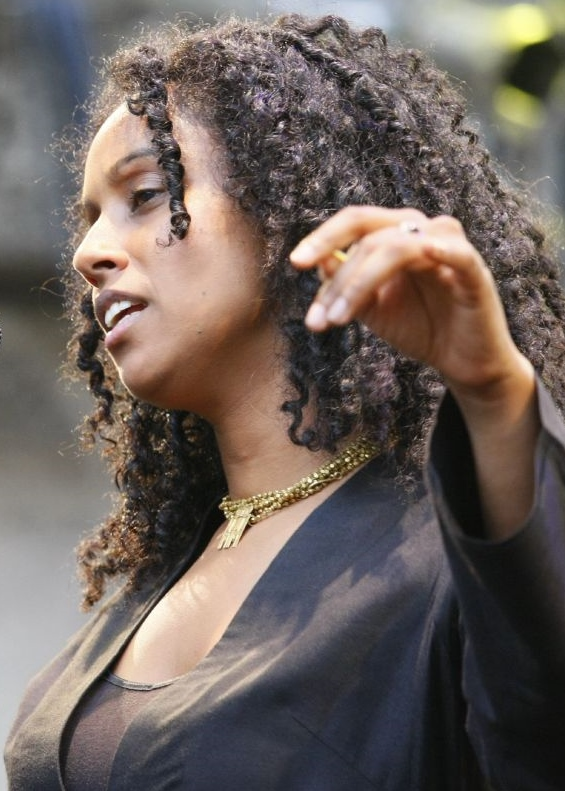
- Raman in Paris Plage, 2007

Background information
- Born: Susheela Raman; Hendon, London, England
- Genres: World music
- Occupations: Singer, songwriter, composer, arranger
- Years active: 1997–present
- Labels: XIII Bis, Narada
- Website: susheelaraman.com

Susheela Raman is a British musician. Her debut album Salt Rain was nominated for the Mercury Prize in 2001 alongside Radiohead and PJ Harvey and won Best Newcomer at the BBC World Music Awards in 2002. She is known for live performances built on the sacred Bhakti and Sufi traditions of India and Pakistan.

== Biography ==
=== Early years ===
Susheela Raman's parents are Tamils from Thanjavur in Tamil Nadu, India, who arrived in London, UK in the mid-1960s. At the age of four, Raman and her family left the UK for Australia. Raman grew up singing Carnatic music and began giving recitals at an early age. She recalls how her family "were eager to keep our Tamil culture alive." As a teenager in Sydney she started her own band, describing its sound as "funk and rock and roll", before branching out into more blues and jazz-based music, which demanded quite different voice techniques. She tried to bring these streams together when in 1995 she travelled to India to rediscover her roots by way of further exploring Carnatic music.

=== Music career ===
Returning to England in 1997, she started to work with her partner, guitarist/producer Sam Mills who had recorded "Real Sugar" with a Bengali singer named Paban Das Baul. According to Raman "it bridged a gap and found common ground for one particular kind of Indian music to be expressed to a new audience." In 1999, Raman co-wrote songs for the album One and One is One by Joi, also performing on the track "Asian Vibes." Mills had worked with West African musicians in the group Tama which also opened musical contact points within the Parisian music scene.

=== Salt Rain ===
After a period of three years collaborating with Sam Mills, Raman released her first album Salt Rain in 2001 on Narada, an American subsidiary of EMI.

The album went gold in France and in the UK was shortlisted for the Mercury Music Prize. Raman also won the Best Newcomer award from BBC Radio 3.

Salt Rain drew on traditional Tamil music blended with jazz-folk and pop influences. It featured original material, as well as old songs Raman sang at recitals when younger.

=== Love Trap ===
In 2003 Raman released her second album Love Trap which featured amongst other collaborators the Nigerian drummer Tony Allen and Tuvan singer Albert Kuvezin of the group Yat-Kha.

The title track is a re-interpretation of an Ethiopian song by Mahmoud Ahmed.

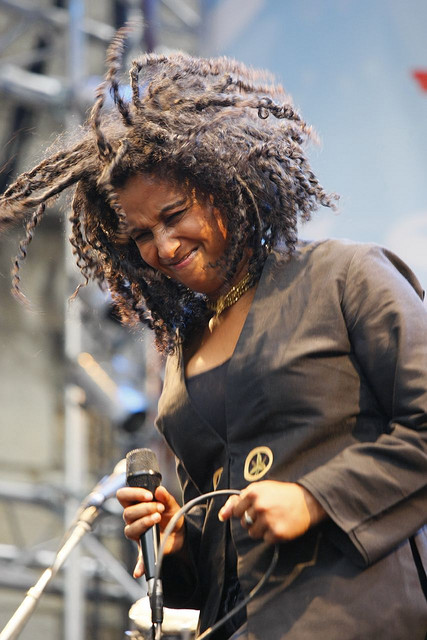
Raman performing in 2007

=== Music for Crocodiles ===
Music for Crocodiles, Raman's third album, was released in 2005. It had been partly recorded in Chennai (Madras), India. The album included "The Same Song" which was used by Mira Nair for the end credits of her film The Namesake. (Nair also used Raman's version of the 1960s Hindi film song "Ye Mera Divanapan Hai" from the previous album).

On Music for Crocodiles Raman sang for the first time in French on "L'Ame Volatile".

Raman's training in Carnatic classical music makes its presence felt in Tamil classical titles such as "Sharavana," her singing "Meanwhile" (on the same album) in a rāgam called Kanakaangi, and in the song "Light Years" which features a melody in Kalyani rāgam as well as the veena playing of Punya 'Devi' Srinivas.

In 2006, Raman was again nominated for a BBC World Music Award and was the subject of a one-hour documentary by French-German TV Channel Arte, called Indian Journey directed by Mark Kidel.

=== 33 1/3 ===
Raman's deal with Narada ended in 2006 and that year she independently recorded an album 33 1/3, a set of re-imaginings of tracks from the nineteen sixties and seventies. Artists covered include Bob Dylan, John Lennon, The Velvet Underground, Captain Beefheart, Jimi Hendrix, Can and Throbbing Gristle. The album features long term collaborators Sam Mills on guitar, Vincent Segal on cello, and tabla player and percussionist Aref Durvesh.

The album was released in April 2007 in France on the independent label XIII Bis.

=== 2008 to 2010 ===
Raman garnered acclaim for her live performances. She continued to research and discover music from Tamil Nadu, studying in 2007 with the Bhakti singer Kovai Kamla.

=== Vel ===
In 2011, Raman released Vel, marking a change in musical direction which was well received.

She followed this up with a series of concerts which showcased her new musical direction, demonstrating, as her reviewers put it "a rousing comeback".

=== 2011 to 2013 ===
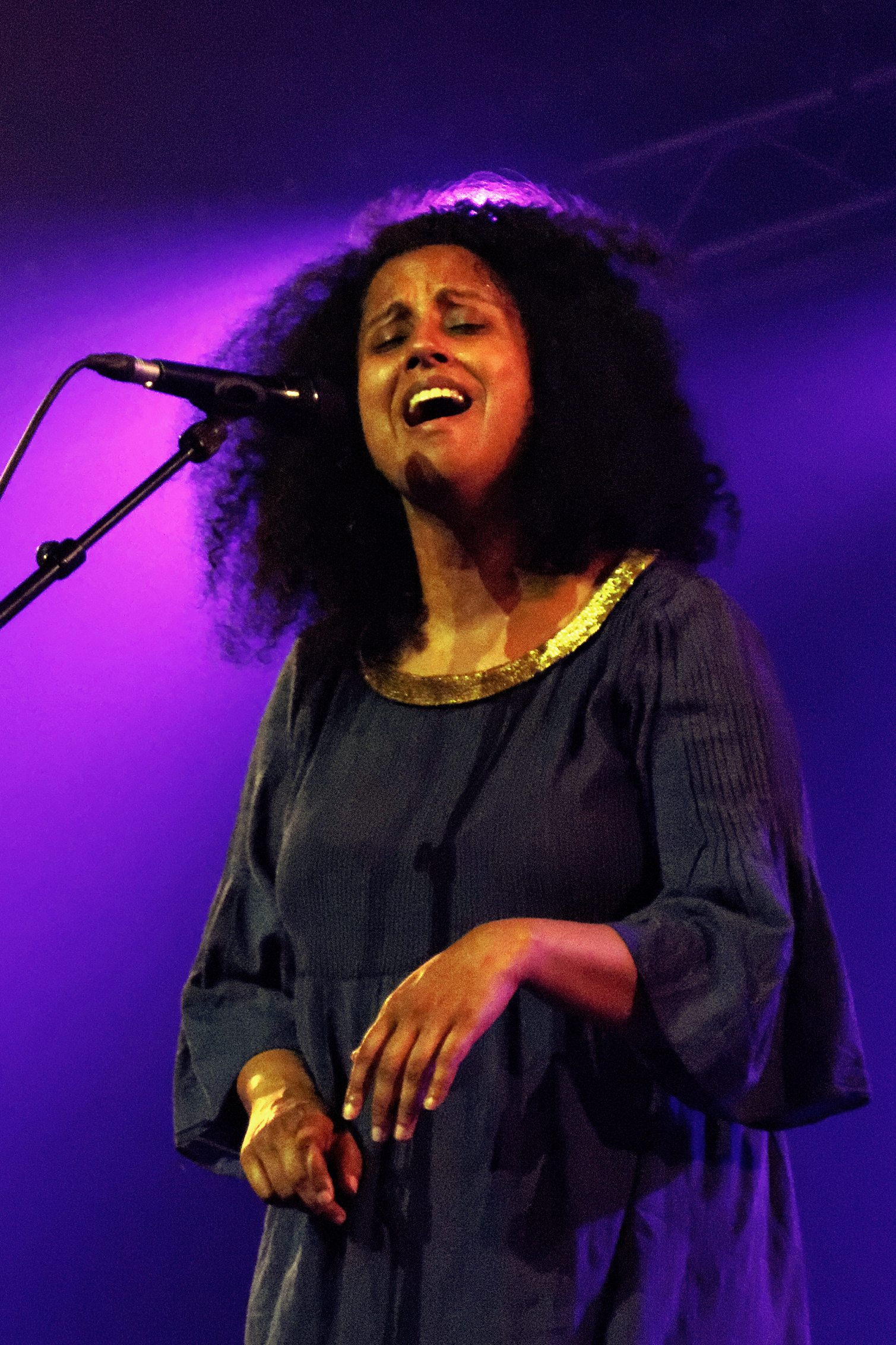
Concert in Brittany (France) in July 2014

Through 2011 to 2013, Raman worked with Sufi Qawali singers and musicians in Lahore in addition to Rajasthani musicians, and continued to explore ecstatic and devotional musical styles.

In 2013, Raman returned to the stage in London at the Royal Festival Hall as part of the Alchemy Festival, having previously played at the Jaipur Literary Festival.

=== Queen Between ===
In September 2013, Raman announced a new, untitled album and requested pledges from fans to ensure its release in spring 2014. The album was released on 1 March 2014 as Queen Between.

== Discography ==
- Salt Rain (2001) No. 29 FRA
- Love Trap (2003) No. 32 FRA
- Music for Crocodiles (2005) No. 51 FRA
- 33 1/3 (2007) No. 120 FRA
- Vel (2011)
- Queen Between (2014)
- Ghost Gamelan (2018)
- Gypsy (2020)

== Video ==
- "Vodoo child"
- "You do right / Bolo bolo"
- ‘Ganapati’ (dir/DOP: Andrew Catlin) (2001)
- ‘Salt Rain’ (dir/DOP: Andrew Catlin) (2001)
- ‘Maya’ (dir/DOP: Andrew Catlin) (2002)
- MTV Unplugged (India): Episode 5 – Susheela Raman – Ennapane

== Narration ==
Other than music, she is well known for narrating documentaries, including BBC's Mountains of the Monsoon and Nilgiris - A Shared Wilderness
