= List of raï musicians =

This is a partial list of musicians and groups of musicians who have worked in the predominantly Algerian raï genre of music.

== Artists ==
- Abdel Ali Slimani
- Ahmed Fakroun
- Boussouar El Maghnaoui
- Boutaiba Sghir
- Bouteldja Belkacem
- Chaba Fadela
- Cheb Bilal
- Cheb Hasni
- Cheb Mami
- Cheb Nasro
- Cheb Sahraoui
- Cheb Tarik
- Cheba Zahouania
- Cheikha Rabia
- Cheikha Rimitti
- Fadela & Sahrawi
- Faudel
- Gana El Maghnaoui
- Houari Manar
- Khaled
- Messaoud Bellemou
- Najim
- Rachid Baba Ahmed
- Rachid Taha
- Raïna Raï
- Reda Taliani
