= List of Algerian musicians =

The following is a list of Algerian musicians:

== A ==
- Abderrahmane Abdelli, musician
- Amar Ezzahi, singer of Chaabi

== B ==
- Bellemou Messaoud, musician
- Blaoui Houari, singer
- Boualem Boukacem, singer

== C ==
- Cheb Hasni, singer
- Cheb Mami, singer
- Cheikha Rimitti, known as the "mother of Raï"

== D ==
- Dahmane El Harrachi, singer composer of Chaabi
- DJ Snake, producer and Disc jockey

== E ==
- El Hachemi Guerouabi, musician
- El Hadj M'Hamed El Anka, "pioneer" of Chaabi

== F ==
- Fadhéla Dziria, singer

== H ==
- Houari Manar, Raï singer
- Hamdi Benani, singer and violinist

== I ==
- Idir, singer

== K ==
- Kamel Messaoudi, composer and singer of Chaabi
- Khaled, singer of Raï

== L ==
- Leila Al Jazairia, singer, actress, and dancer
- Lias Saoudi, British-Algerian singer
- Lounis Aït Menguellet, singer and musician
- Lounès Matoub, singer, musician, and political activist
- Lolo Zouai, French-Algerian/America singer

== M ==
- Mohamed Tahar Fergani, musician and "master" of the Malouf style

== R ==
- Rachid Baba Ahmed, producer
- Rachid Taha, musician and singer
- Raïna Raï, band from Sidi Bel-Abbes

== S ==
- Speed Caravan, band
- Souad Massi French-Algerian singer songwriter

== W ==
- Warda Al-Jazairia, referred to as "the Algerian rose"

== Z ==
- Zaho, R&B singer

== See also ==
- Algerian music
