= Boutaiba Sghir =

Algerian singer and songwriter

- Birth name: Mohamed Affif
- Born: June 4, 1945; Chaabet El Ham, Algeria
- Genres: Raï
- Occupations: Singer, musician (Arabic, French)
- Instruments: violin

Boutaiba Sghir (born June 4, 1945) is an Algerian raï singer and songwriter.

== Biography ==
In 1963, he released his first single, at 18, Chetek el Berah. In 1963, he gave his first concert "Scène d'été" in Chaabet El Ham and Aïn Témouchent. His first success came in 1968 with the single El Caoucaou. Then he was a violinist for the orchestra of Oran radio from 1967 to 1969. In 1969, Raba Raba and El Fermliya are released and are still appreciated to this day by the public.

Like a lot of raï artists of his generation, he began his raï singer career at the end of 60s with Melhoun Bedoui music (also called old raï)

With Boussouar El Maghnaoui, Bouteldja Belkacem and the musician Gana El Maghnaoui, he was one of the fathers of modern raï (also called pop Bedoui or pop raï). Boutaiba Sghir has also worked with Messaoud Bellemou a notorious Algerian trumpeter.

Boutaiba Sghir will inspire many singers like Cheb Khaled. Cheb Khaled would said about him: "I am not the king of rai, I'm the ambassador. The real king is Boutaiba Sghir, it was he who taught me everything".

In an interview for an Algerian video about the Raï History only in Algeria (see external links), Boutaiba Sghir declared to an Algerian journalist " The raï music was prohibited in all Algerian media (radios and TV) during the 70's". That is why there is no video of Algerian raï singers in Algerian TV or radio archives from the 70s. He has also declared in different videos on YouTube that Cheb Hasni is not a Raï Singer but an Asri Singer and that the pop raï (also called modern Bedoui or modern raï) existed before the coming of the trumpeter Bellemou.

In September 2010, Boutaiba Sghir was invited in Paris by Cheb Khaled with Maurice El Medioni, Cheb Sahraoui and Chaba Zahouania for a concert in tribute to Oran, entitled Oran Café.

== Songs ==
- Chetek el Berah
- El Caoucaou
- Raba Raba
- El Fermliya
- El Ghira T'Hadar
