= Sfinks Festival =

Pop Festival

Coordinates: 51.162°N 4.493°E

Sfinks 2016

Sfinks is a global pop festival that annually takes place in Boechout, Belgium, a village southeast of Antwerp. The first edition dates back to 1976. The festival usually takes place on the last weekend of July. Since 2023, Sfinks has been organizing two festivals: the one-day festival "Sfinks Mundial" in May, and the four-day festival "Sfinks Mixed" in July.

Both festivals are free and focus on sustainability, accessibility, gender equality, and safety for everyone.

== Etymology ==
The name Sfinks comes from the two stone sphinxes in the park of Sint-Gabriëlcollege, where the festival used to take place.

== History ==
In its early years, Sfinks focused on folk music. It mainly featured Anglo-Saxon groups, such as the Irish band Clannad. From 1982 onwards, it slowly grew into the world music festival it is today. Youssou N'Dour, Cheb Khaled, and Nusrat Fateh Ali Khan, among others, performed in Boechout during this period.

In 1994, the festival moved to a larger site, the Molenveld. By then, it had grown into a four-day event with more stages and a more diverse program. In 2008, Sfinks was reduced to three days and the name of the festival was changed to Sfinks Mixed. In addition to music, theater, circus and comedy acts were also programmed for the first time.

In 2013, Sfinks faced financial difficulties due to the loss of government subsidies. In response to these changes, it was decided to implement some drastic changes: admission was made free and the duration of the festival was increased by one day. The organizers hoped that this would attract a larger audience.

== Secondary activities ==
The Sfinks organization is also responsible for programming "de Zomer van Antwerpen" (The Summer of Antwerp); two months of theater, music, film, and dance at various locations in Antwerp. It also coordinates the European Forum of Worldwide Music Festivals, a network of 46 festivals in 18 European countries. And they collaborate aswell with the annual Festival au Désert, held every January in Mali.

== 1976 ==
Jesse Winchester & Band, Garden, 5th Ball Gang, Mmmm, Lieven, Recompensa

== 1977 ==
Brenda Wootton, Swan Arcade, Battle Field band

== 1978 ==
De Snaar, John Kirkpatrick & Sue Harris, La Romanderie

== 1979 ==
Wannes Van De Velde, Clannad, John Renbourn

=== 1980 ===
Vermenton Plage, The McCalmans, Marie Jeanne Tellez, Arthus, Fiddle Feaver, Rum, Aristide Padygros, Stockton's Wing, Fran O'Rourke, Trol, Ossian, Bob Frank en Zussen, Brenda Wootton, Angélique Ionatos, Nino de San Andres y sus Flamenco Orkestra, Rocking Dopsie & The Cajun Twisters

=== 1981 ===
Cromlech, Samboa, Paula Lockheart, Le Quator, André Bialek, Queen Ida & Le Bon Temps, Mandanga, Canto Libre, Carlos Andreu, Akka, Bonga, Juan Jose Mosalini Y Su Gran Orchestra De Tango, Vizönto and Deka

=== 1982 ===
Super Combo Créole, Big Bamboo Calypso Band, Lazare Kenmenge, Sacy Perere, Bovick and Partners, Koko Taylor Blues Machine, Makam es Kolinda, Toto Guillaume, Francis Bebey, Manu Dibango, Azuquita y Su Melao

=== 1983 ===
Bula Sangoma, Los Salseros, Francis Bebey Quartet, Xalam, Tito Puente, Dudu Pukwana, Lembá, Ronald Shannon Jackson, Abdullah Ibrahim and Touré Kunda

=== 1984 ===
-> Sfinks introduces a new stage (the Tent Stage)

Andy Narell, Idir, Mongo Santa María, Franco et le T.P.O.K. Jazz, Machitún, El Kholoud, Baklava, Ekomé Dance Co., Fawzy Al Aïedy, Sun Ra Arkestra, Orchestre Jazira, Malembe, Lamogoya, Original Bushtown Rumours

=== 1985 ===
Somo Somo, Zazou & Bikaye, Joia, Astor Piazzolla, JR Walker & the All Stars, Mashenka, Thoko Mdlalose, Paulinho Ramos, DjurDjura, Thomas Mapfumo and The Blacks Unlimited, Revanche, The Lounge Lizzards

=== 1986 ===
Claudy & Co, Carte de Séjour, Don Cherry Quintet, Working Week, Tania Maria, The Skyblasters, Eko Kuango, Desmond Dekker, Mahmoud Ahmed ft Neway Debebe & The Roha Band, Carmel, Youssou N'Dour, Kabbala and Waka Wakah

=== 1987 ===
Sahl'omon, Lee Perry & The Upsetters, The Real Sounds of Africa, Gil Scott-Heron, Gilberto Gil, Macoubary, Zeebra, Flaco Jiménez su Conjunto, Courtney Pine Quartet, Gonzalo Rubalcaba y su grupo projecto, Kaba Mane, Toots & The Maytalls and Kalabash

=== 1988 ===
Ramiro Naka & N'Kassa Cobra, Andy Sheppard Quintet, David Rudder & Charly's Roots, Nina Simone, Thione Seck & Le Raam Daan, Shalawambe, S. E. Rogie, Toumani Diabate-Ketama ft Danny Thompson, Nusrat Fateh Ali Khan, Abdel Aziz El Mubarak, Alpha Blondy & The Solar System, Yemaya and Ali Farka Touré

=== 1989 ===
Gilberto Gil, Umbelina, Pardesi Music Machine, King Sunny Adé, Remmy Ongala & Orchestre Matimila, Cheb Khaled, Panache Culture, Trilok Gurtu, Les Musiciens du Nile, Kristi Rose & The Midnight Walkers, Papa Wemba, Zouk Machine and Chi-Kin-Chee & Akwaaba

=== 1990 ===
Irshad Khan, Toto Bissainthe, Chaba Djena, Les Têtes Brulées, Les Négresses Vertes, Princesse Mansia M'Bila, Sido ft Tamba Kumba, Jemaa, Najma Akhtar, Ivo Papazov & His Bulgarian Wedding Orchestra and Mexe Com Tudo

=== 1991 ===
Hossan Ramzy, Caramusa, Super Diamono de Dakar, Aster Aweke, Femi Anikulapo ft Kuti, Mav Cacharel, Xiomara Fortuna & ses Kaliumbe, Seckou & Ramata, the Rebirth Brass Band, Farafina, Sapho, Rubén Blades and Zekle

=== 1992 ===
Taraf de Haïdouks, Staatskoor van de Bulgaarse radio en televisie, Anoosh, Donke, Marisa Monte, Wallias Band, Los Reyes, Fuzue, Stella Rambisai Chiwese and The Earthquake Band, Eduardo Muniz, La Kumpania Zelwer, Lili Boniche, Orchestre Anti Choc de Bozi, Boziana, Olodum, Linton Kwesi Johnson, Paulus Damenië & Band and Phantoms

=== 1993 ===
Donnisulana, Karoline Zaidline, Amiina, Ritos, Sarband, Nusrat Fateh Ali Khan & Party, Abana Ba Nasery, Lokua Kanza, Jean Emilien, Ghorwane, Classic Swede Swede, Ara Ketu, Les Amazones de Guinée, Donn Pullen's Afro Brazilian Connection, Bauls, Hedningarna, Los Van Van, Barrister, Fabulous Trobadors, Joji Hirota, Julie Mourillon, Molequa de Rua, Mouth Music, Ali Hassan Kuban, Reconciliation, Dmitri Pokrovsky Ensemble, Zap Mama, Super Rail Band de Bamako and Ray Lema et les voix Bulgares de l'ensemble Pirin

=== 1994 ===
N'Java, Simentera, Lo'Jo Triban, Transglobal Underground, Jah Wobble & The Invaders of the Heart, Ngaari Laaw, N'Java, Gary Thomas & Hossam Ramzy, Simentera, Gitans ft Thierry Robin, The Last Poets, Aziza Mustafa Zadeh, Baaba Maal, Tierra Caliente, Snowboy, N'Dai N'Dai, Cheb Mami, Les Quatre Étoiles, Psamim, Gulabo Sapera, Tammurriata Di Scafati, A Filetta, Tuareg Bali, Juan Jose Mosalini Y Su Gran Orchestra De Tango, Cheb Khaled, I Muvrini, Lo'Jo Triban, The Klezmatics, The Western Diamonds, Papa Jube & The Jubelation Band, The Academy Brass Band and Kočani Orkestar

=== 1995 ===
Ang Grupong Pendong, Gary Thomas & Hossam Ramzy, Mandé Foli, Youssou N'Dour, Sangit, Tuu, Yat-Kha, Patrick Persée, Balanescu Quartet, Lotfi Bouchnak & Ensemble Al Kindi, Ali Farka Touré, Master Musicians of Jajouka, Mandé Foli, Totó la Momposina, Prophets of Da City, Granmoun Léle, Remmy Ongala & Orchestre Super Matimila, Fanfare Jaïpur, Lulendo, Aurora Moreno, Eric Marchand et Le Taraf de Caransebeş, Mynta, Les Grand-Mères de Djanet, Sabri Brothers, Remmy Ongala & Totó la Momposina, Manu Dibango's Wakafrika Project ft Ray Lema & Mory Kanté & Bonga, Habib Koité et Bamada, Chico Science & Nação Zumbi and Papa Wemba

=== 1996 ===
Danyèl Waro, La Vieja Trova, Mestre Ambrosio, Genetic Drugs ft Karma Club, Yawar, Cesária Évora, La Vieja Trova, Kayo Fujino, Langa, Luzmila Carpio y sus Llaqtamasikuna, Noche Flamenco, Kangaroo Moon, The Bollywood Band, Danyèl Waro, Up, Bustle and Out, Chaba Fadela & Cheb Sahraoui, Kanda Bongo Man, Tenores di Bitti, Hukwe Zawose & Wagogo Woman Drummers and Dancers, Banyumas Bamboo, Zehava Ben, Mighty Sparrow, Crocodile Style & Yawar, Iwakichi & Noriko Yamashita, Ekova, Yungchen Lhamo, Te Ava Piti, Ferus Mustafov, Mestre Ambrosio, Jaojoby, Mama Ohandja, Detrimental, Malouma Mint Meideh, Flamenco de Jerez, Yulduz Usmonova and Marzieh

=== 1997 ===
Los Activos, Lunar Drive, Sally Nyolo, Tambours Sacrés, Voces Del Al-Andalus, Daniel Abebe, Ailanis, Ensemble Mzetamze, Didg Trio ft. Gary Thomas & Alan Dargin & Phillip Peris, Musafir, Lunar Drive, Gil & The Perfects, Sierra Maestra, The Asian Equation, Angélique Kidjo, Diblo Dibala & Matchatcha, D'Gary, Sékouba Bambino Diabate, Enrique Morento Y Gruppo, Amampondo, Carlinhos Brown, Tchota Suari & Antoni Sanches, Alla, Matlubeh, Sam Mangwana, Los Activos, Ouza Diallo, Sally Nyolo, Anastasia, Cándido Fabré, Psarantonis, Te Vaka, Emil Zrihan & the Israeli Andalusian Orchestra, Natacha Atlas and Radio Tarifa

=== 1998 ===
Nēnēs, Zarboutan, Combays, Daúde, Jorge Ben Jor, Maracuta Naçao Pernambuco, Zarboutan, Jimi Mbaye, La Familia Valera Miranda, Avaton, Kadda Cherif Hadria, Monique Séka, Bulgarka Junior ft Ivan Lantos & Missa Primi Toni, Moriba Koita, Shahram Nazeri & Ensemble Dastan, Isabel Bayón, Nēnēs, Tartit, La Charanga Habanera, Wimme, Extra Musica, Gnawa 'Lila', Combays, Ismael Rudas & Daniel Celedon, Sawt El Atlas, Africando, Musa Dieng Kala, Susana Baca, Ismael Rudas & Daniel Celedon, Liu Sola, Nahawa Doumbia, Xu Chao Minh, Musa Dieng Kala, Massa Konate, Liu Sola, Didges ft. Gary Thomas & Alan Dargin & Mark Atkins, Susana Baca, Likembe Geant and Eleftheria Arvanitaki - Adonis Mitzelos (2000)

=== 1999 ===
Leilía, Swédé Lokelé, Bagunçaço, Brotherhood of Brass, Trip do Brasil, Mahnimal, El Hadj N'Diaye, Teófilo Chantre, Alim Qasimov, Belén Maya & Mayte Martín, Sahraouis, Swédé Lokelé, Abdel Ali Slimani, Frédéric Galliano & Néba Solo, Super Cayor De Dakar, Bloque (band), Empire Bakuba, DJ Jungle Jazz, Manos Achalinotopoulos, Urna, La Banda Municipale de Santiago de Cuba, Sertab Erener, Alfredo de la Fé, Dhol Foundation, El Hadj N'Diaye, RDB, Black Star Liner, Dj Master Volume, Dj Ritu, DJ Aki, Joi, The Saint Nicholas Orchestra, The Farlanders, Aterciopelados, Brother Resistance & Rapso Riddum, Mamar Kassey, Jigme Drukpa, Abed Azrié (Suerte), Camerata Romeu, DJ Timmax, Melina Kana & Ashkabad, Leilía, Pact, Sheikh Yasîn Al-Tuhâmi, DJ Cheb i Sabbah, Amadou & Mariam, Sidestepper, DJ Armand, Ashkabad and Hypnotix

=== 2013 ===
Concert tent: The Paradise Bangkok Molam International Band, Dakhabrakha, Akua Naru, Che Sudaka, Buscemi, Daniel Haaksman Xamanek, Gaby Amarantos, Batucada Sound Machine, Ky-Mani-Marley, Civalizee Foundation, Dj Babybang, Salam Musik, Azalai Project, Guido Belcanto, Terakaft, Gaby Amartontos, Turntable Dubbers, mps PILOT, Coely, The Flexican ft. MC Sef, Captain Steel, Kapitein Winokio, Sana Bob, Lindigo, Ricardo Lemvo & El Bataillon De La Rumba, Clement Peerens Explosition (CPeX)

=== 2014 ===
Vroink, Amigos, De Piepkes, Radio Oorwoud, Leki, Palenke Soultribe, Jupiter & Okwess International, Orquesta Aragon, Discobar Galaxie, Tinariwen, Flip Kowlier, Binti, Catrin Finch & Seckou Keita, Bassekou Kouyate & Ngoni Ba, Boddhi Satva, Karol Conka, Lady S., Lefto, Dj Marfox, Broukar,...

=== 2015 ===
Los De Abajo, Uproot Andy, Fresku, Jan Leyers, Merdan Taplak, Mr. Fuzz, Mystique, Omulu, Cheikh Lo, Slongs Dievanongs, Discobaar A Moeder, The Flexican ft. Mc Sef, Cookachoo, Zwartwerk, Bunny Wailer, Mashrou Leila, Nomobs, Fs Green & Mc Fit, Dj Satelite, Dj Ike, Olcay Bayir, Noreum Machi, Lady S, Ferro Gaita, Bart Peeters, Nidia Minaj, Pablo Fierro, Bossa Negra, Bachar Mar-Khalifé

=== 2016 ===
Barrio Lindo, Freddie Mc Gregor, Heinz Baut, KarKarKar, Kel Assouf, Papa Mojito, Positive Sound Soldier, Rachid Taha, Sven Van Hees, Wesli, Young Gum Superior, Abder, Bambou Negro, Buscemi, Dj Firmeza, Ertebrekers, Selector Matanzas, Tsiganisation Project, U Percutirlos, Blick Bassy, Broederliefde, Den Sorte Skole, Doylu, Ephiniko, Esteban Murillo & Marisol, Gan Gah, Jesse Royal, Junior Goodfellas, Kasba, Makazi, Manu Dibango, Masai, Osei Bantu, Raion Martirò, Renato Baccarat & UTZ, Roland, Savane, Sol Del Nene, Subtronics, Bibi Seck, Bora?, Borokov, Deltas, Elida Almeida, Fornication Hifi, Guido Belcanto, Khaira Arby, Marcia Griffiths, Mensch erger je niet, Noura Mint, Radio oorwoud, Tigana Santana, Troitsa, Vardan Emre

=== 2017 ===
Mariachi Reloaded, Aurelio, Boef, La-33, Ali Farka Touré Band, Soufiane Eddyani, Clam, TLP, Soul Shakers, Primos Del Norte ft. Jorinde Cielen, Moon gogo, Gongmyoung, Lucibela, Khan Bogd, Villa Diamante, Nonkel Guy, Lady S B22B Dany Neville, Supafly Collective, Godwonder, Livitones, Hearthmann & Rose, Coucious BE + MC, Puppa Mighty's Super Power, Les Mamas, Papa Mojito, Khan Bogd, Bakra Bike Soundsystem, Radio Oorwoud, Zina Daoudia, 47 Soul, Cléu, Eliades Ochoa & Cuarteto Patria, Toko Telo, Maya Youssef, Rajab Suleiman & Kithara, Zhou Family Band, Abena, Matrub, DJ Team Gomoris, Dubfront & Onda Sonora, High'r Ites & Marie, Banka Bike Soundsystem, Refugees for Refugees, Wally, Seun Kuti & Egypt 80, Labels, Merdan Taplak, DTM Funk, Liyo, Princess Flor, Simon Hold, Foozen Ken, Txarango, Inner Circle, Panache culture, CinCity, Skillzington, Black Mamba, Ari3sj, Pikaman & MC Dhazed, 18 inch

=== 2018 ===
Zap Mama, Oumou Sangaré, Sona Jobarteh, Totó la Momposina, Julian Marley, Zee Avi, Lucibela, Doctor Prats, Asmâa Hamzaoui, Dj Nuri, Aeham Ahmad, Inveside, Papa Mojito, New York Salsa All Stars, Sayon Bamba, The Grey Stars, Lorena Nunes

=== 2019 ===
Antwerp All Star Band, Baloji, Bankra Bike Soundsystem, Cirque Tango, Daniel Toja, DJ Kobalt, Jali Madi, Kevin Kofii, Les Tambours Sacré, Lila Iké, Dj Pö, Tássia Reis, Tropkillaz, Chicos y Mendez, Faisal, Gnawa Diffusion, Habib Koite, Hibotep, Slongs, Sumac Dub, Abena, Alexander Abreu, Anais B, Catu Diosis, Esinam, Khadija Bidaouia, Kristel, Laurence Revey, Leki, Leo Justy, Mercedes Peon, Million Stylez, Nafthaly Ramona, Negresses Vertes, Nitsa, Rabba, The Tune, Dimitri Leue, Wael Alkak, Anthony B, Astghiks Snetunts, Emily Dust, Feniks Taiko, High Grade Sound, Jovenes Classicos del son, Lister, Manou Gallo, Moh!Kouyaté, Orchestra Baobab, Radio Oorwoud, Tartitt

=== 2020 ===
Cancelled due to the ongoing COVID-19 crisis.

=== 2021 ===
MISST, Feniks Taiko, Mayo Rivera & Connexion Cubana, Tomi Y Su TimbaLight, Papa Mojito, De Notengalm Boechout, Los Guapos del Ritmo + Salsa Relevaron, Moving Forward Dance C^{o}, Slongs, Manou Gallo, Zap Mama, Kumbia Boruka, Black Koyo, De KetnetBand, Jamaican Jazz Orchestra, The Grey Stars, Rumbaristas, Elida Almeida, Elin Valery, Los Zaperos, 't Akkoord + Majoretski, Kapitein Winokio, Skala B, Jaouad, Rootsriders, La Fanfarria Del Capitan, Dj Kisa, Dj Womad, Murga Agrum, The Bracket Percussion Ensemble, Teatro Pavana

=== 2022 ===
Sfinks organises a smaller- scale edition featuring only outdoor stages, due to COVID-19.

Concert stage	Clubkiosk	The Urban Mad	Site
Bamba Wassoulou Groove	Alostmen	Assia mk ft MC Rim	Black Koyo
Bonga	Aurélie Dorzée & Tom Theuns	Catu Diosis	Cie Monad - Yin Zéro
Chouk Bwa & Angströmers	Bijlmer Steelband	Danykas DJ	Forefote
De KetnetBand	Chapulines	Dj Abena	Humanity Brassband
Eliades Ochoa - Star of Buena Vista Social Club️	Dabke Love	Dj Satelite	Papa Mojito
Elin Valery	ESINAM	Dj Shar Perez	
Julian Marley	Etran de L'Aïr	Dj-Lister	
Lady S	Flor de Toloache	High Grade Sound	
Las Karamba	Motilonas Rap	HotLiBBS	
Les Amazones d'Afrique	Nicolas Mortelmans	Kay C	
Mokoomba	Senny Camara	Manz	
Pamela Badjogo	TomBack	Marielou	
Puri	Voice Your Diversity	Motie van Wanvrouwen	
Radio Oorwoud	ZEM	Ninette	
Septeto Santiaguero		SAHRA	
Soul Shakers		Stranger Souma	
Star Feminine Band			
Tabanka			
Taraf de Caliu			
The Garifuna Collective			

=== 2023 ===
Concert stage	Clubkiosk	The Urban Mad	Site
Aboubakar Traoré & Balima	Alba Carmona	A Slay	Black Victorians door Jeanefer Jean-Charles
Adédèji	Ana Carla Maza	Abena	Dieudonné Fokou
Bab L'Bluz	Dobrila & Dorian duo	Bona Léa	Papa Mojito
Bart Peeters & De Ideale Mannen	Imane Guemssy & Tiganwa	Clara!	
David Calzado y su Charanga Habanera	Madalitso Band	Dj MIMI	
Dj Kisa	Meral Polat trio	Kawtar Sadik	
Emicida	Suonno d'Ajere	Lady S	
Johnny Den Artiest & Asham band	Widad Mjama & Khalil Epi: aita mon amour	Mama OD	
K.ZIA	Zo! Gospel Choir	MILINGUAP	
Kader Tarhanine		Monicashflow	
KD Soundsystem		Moreny	
Orkestra Braka Kadrievi		Ninette	
ROBIN ROXETTE		Raql	
Rodrigo Cuevas		Rockefellababe	
Sahad		VON DI	
Salif Keïta			
Son Rompe Pera			
Tanya Stephens			
Teófilo Chantre			
Yemi Alade			

=== 2024 ===
Concert stage	Clubkiosk	The Urban Mad	Site
Andy Mwag	Alexandra Archetti & Steinar Raknes	Amazonika	Harmony's Brass Band
Black Uhuru	Bertânia Almeida	Batekoo	Papa Mojito
Calle Mambo	Harmony's brass band	Bo Meng	Stephen & Fiora - Acrocordion
Derya Yıldırım & Grup Şimşek	Magou Samb & Raphaële Murer	Brooke Bailey	
Dj lister	Nicolas Mortelmans Quartet	Catu Diosis	
Dj Sahra	nuMori	Coco em	
Dobet Gnahoré	Pankisi Ensemble	DJ Morena	
Elin Valery	Sauljaljui	Dj-Lister	
iLe	Siti and the band	Metralleta Dj	
K.Zia & Zap Marie		Miss Mak	
Kalascima		NC	
Kapitein Winokio		Queenteiro	
La-33		Rrita Jashari	
Margareth Menezes		Shar Perez	
Maya Kamaty		Shug La Sheedah	
Moonlight Benjamin		Soumeya Dj	
Nina Ogot			
Tarwa N-Tiniri			
The Leila			
WahWahsda			

=== 2025 ===
Concert stage	Clubkiosk	The Urban Mad	Site
47Soul	Barrut	AiiRA MORENA	Afrokata
Bombino	Bia Ferreira	Brooke x Taliyah	Cie Amoukanama – Trio Limaniya
Boule Mpanya	Ensemble Chakâm	Dj Abena	Livia Mattos
Buscemi	Esinam & Sibusile Xaba	Dj Lisa	Papa Mojito
Dj Kisa	Mandé Sila featuring Habib Koité, Aly Keïta, Lamine Cissokho, Mama Koné	DJ Lister	
Fela Kuti Celebration Band	Mariaa Siga	Dj Moreny	
Isam Elias	Noura Mint Seymali	dj Nimbah Naye	
Issac Delgado	Saad Tiouly	DJ Noahh	
Kader Tarhanine	Siân Pottok	DJ Sahra	
Kapitein Winokio		FVTMV	
Ky-Mani Marley		Monicashflow	
La Fanfarria del Capitan		NC	
Livia Mattos		Queen Honey B	
Omar Pene & Super Diamono de Dakar		Rokia Bamba	
Outlet Drift		Rose Lea	
Queralt Lahoz		Shar Pérez	
Sona Jobarteh			
Tasuta N-Imal			
Think Of One			
Tribute to Max Romeo			

=== 2026 ===
In 2026, Sfinks Mixed took place from 23 to 26 July at the Molenveld in Boechout as a free-admission festival.

Concert stage	Club	The Urban Mad	Site
Alain Pérez Y La Orquesta	Antti Paalanen	Brooke Bailey & Taliyah Ayana	Assia Brass Bénin
Armana Khan	Hilgeum	Dj Jems	Bonkers Kidsrave
Assia Brass Bénin	Imane Guemssy	Dj Lister	Maninka Company
Bob Marley Tribute By Rootsriders & Mo Ali	Jonathan Ferr	Dj Moreny	Moving Forward Dance Community & Company
Ceuzany X Jenifer Solidade	Juliette Magnevasoa	Dj Nimbah Naye	Papa Mojito
Cesária Évora Orchestra	Lavinia Mancusi	Dj Q. Honey B	Project Klank
Dj Kisa B2b Femmetastic	Maia Barouh	Dj Abena	Zing
Ebony	Mostafa Taleb & Milad Mohammadi	Gajoy	
Labess	Space Quartet	Makossiri	
La Delio Valdez		Moja Presents: Ninette (Live Show) + Marielou	
Lubiana		Morenita	
Mádé Kuti & The Movement		Nc	
Nuevos Ríos		Raql	
Rumbaristas		Rose Lea	
Sahra		Stranger Souma	
Scaletta Kids			
