= Cheb (musician) =

Moroccan singer-songwriter and comedian

- Also known as: Cheb شيحاجة
- Born: Nabil El Amraoui; 15 July 1990 (age 36); Oulmes, Morocco
- Genre: Traditional Moroccan Music
- Occupations: Singer, Songwriter, Producer
- Instruments: Guitar, Piano, Synth, Oud, loutar
- Years active: 2018–present
- Website: https://cheb.bandcamp.com/

Nabil El Amraoui (Arabic: نبيل العمراوي), known as Cheb (الشاب), is a Moroccan singer-songwriter and comedian from Oulmes, Morocco. He has been described as a talented lyricist with a keen interest in traditional Moroccan music.

== Biography ==
He started studying music at 15, at first with the guitar, followed by the loutar after 2 or 3 years from studying guitar, the oud, the violin, and the piano and synthesizer.

He studied at the High Institute of Theatrical Arts and Cultural Animation in Rabat.

He currently resides in Bordeaux, France.

== Influences ==
He is influenced by Zayane Berber folk music, having grown up with the sounds of Mohamed Rouicha, Azlmat, and Hadda Ouakki. He is also influenced by the chaabi songs played at weddings and parties in Rabat's al-Kamra neighborhood, as well as the raï songs of artists such as Cheb Hasni, Cheb Mami, Khaled, Cheb Nasro, Cheb Bilal, and Cheb Rizki that would play at the billiard halls. Among chaabi influences, Cheb cites Hajib (musician), Miloud Lamghari, El Bhiri, Najat Aatabou, as well as old names of aita music. Later on, with satellite dishes, he was introduced to sharqi, or Middle Eastern music, and with the internet, rock, metal, and jazz. Cheb has also expressed an appreciation for the music of Ziad Rahbani.

== Music ==
Cheb is an internet sensation, with cult popularity on YouTube. His music has been described as "purely Moroccan," making use of authentic chaabi rhythms.

=== Lyrics ===
Cheb writes his songs in "pure" Darija, or Moroccan vernacular Arabic. The lyrical content of his music has been described as idiosyncratic, at once mundane and profound. His song al-mā'an (الماعن "The Dishes") in particular has drawn attention.

=== Albums ===
- Tkharshish (تخرشيش), 2018
- Akhar as-Sa'alik al-Muhtaramin (آخر الصعاليك المحترمين), 2019
- Sma’ Balak (سمع بالاك), 2021

=== Songs ===
- Wslatkom Chi Haja Mn Chamch? (وصلاتكم شي حاجة من الشمش؟), 2021
- Helahoppa (هيلاهوبا), 2021
- Doremifasolasi (دو ري مي فا صو لا سي), 2021
- Hammam alzalqin (حمّام الزّالِݣين), 2021
- B'lil, F'sma (بالليل، فالسما), 2024

Sma’ Balak (سمع بالاك), 2021

- Reklam (ريكلام), 2021
- Fi Tabi'atin Ma (في طبيعة ما), 2020
- Dwaqa Wlla... Ghellaqa? (ذواقة ولا غلاقة؟), 2020
- Scandale (سكونضال), 2020
- Fi Intidhar Sandwich (في انتظار السندويش), 2021
- Doar Al Alam Attaleth (دوار العالم الثالث), 2020
- Hna El Caramel (حنا الكراميل), 2020
- Ajmal Balad Fi Al Alam (اجمل بلد فالعالم!), 2020
- Saifan (صيفا), 2020

Akhar as-Sa'alik al-Muhtaramin (آخر الصعاليك المحترمين), 2019

- Bghina Lil Maysalich (بغينا الليل ميساليش), 2019
- Kutukutu (كوتوكوتو), 2019
- Ghabra d Njom (غبرة دنجوم), 2019
- Fin A Smaïn? (فين اسماعين؟), 2019
- Hassan (حسن), 2019
- An Lma'en (عن الماعن), 2019
- Majanin (مجانين), 2019
- Tajine El Hout (طجين الحوت), 2019
- Lloha (اللوحة), 2019
- L'ars (العرس), 2019
- Zin Zin Zin (زين زين زين), 2019

Tkharshish (تخرشيش), 2018

- Wakha? (واخا؟), 2018
- Douar Al Alam Al Thaleth (دوار العالم الثالت), 2018
- Sir O Aji (سير و اجي), 2018
- Lahrira (الحريرة), 2018
- Choclatati' (شكلاطتي), 2018
- L'ayach' (العياشة), 2018
- Lhazqa (الحزقة), 2018
- Lhsab Sabon (الحساب صابون), 2018
- Sgo'ya (صكوعية), 2018
- Comparse (كومبارس), 2018
- Nti Dnya Nti? (نتي دنيا نتي؟), 2018
- 260 (٢٦٠), 2018
- Sfar o Rose (صفر وغوز), 2018
