= Houari =

Houari is a given name and surname. It may refer to:

== Persons ==
=== Given name ===
- Houari Boumédiène, also transcribed Boumediene, Boumedienne etc. (1932–1978), served as Chairman of the Revolutionary Council of Algeria from 19 June 1965 until 12 December 1976 and thereafter as the second President of Algeria until his death on 27 December 1978
- Houari Benchenet (born 1961), Algerian raï singer
- Houari Djemili (born 1987), Algerian footballer
- Houari Ferhani (born 1993), Algerian footballer
- Houari Manar (1981–2019), Algerian raï singer

=== Surname ===
- Sidi El Houari (1350–1439), Algerian imam
- Blaoui Houari (1926-2017), Algerian singer-songwriter, composer and conductor
- Kamel Jdayni Houari (born 1980), better known as Kamelancien later shortened into Kamelanc', French rapper of Moroccan origin
- Mohammed Houari (born 1977), Moroccan player
- Muriel Hurtis-Houairi or Hurtis-Houari (born 1979), French track and field athlete

== See also ==
- Méchraâ Houari Boumédienne, a town and commune in Abadla District, Béchar Province, in western Algeria
- Houari Boumediene Airport, Algerian airport
- University of Science and Technology Houari Boumediene, Algerian university
