= You Are Mine (album) =

Studio album by Chaba Fadela
- Released: 1988
- Genre: Raï
- Label: Mango
- Producer: Rachid Baba Ahmed

Chaba Fadela chronology
You Are Mine (1988)	Hana Hana (1989)

You Are Mine is the debut album by the Algerian musician Chaba Fadela. It was released in 1988. "N'sel Fik (You Are Mine)" was sung with Fadela's ex-husband; it had been an international hit. The album is also referred to as pop-raï. Fadela supported You Are Mine with a North American tour.

== Production ==
Recorded in Algeria, the album was produced by Rachid Baba Ahmed. Fadela recorded her vocals first, with the musical backing added by Ahmed. Ahmed mixed instruments such as the derbouka with synthesizer sounds. The title track first appeared internationally on the Rai Rebels compilation.

== Critical reception ==
Professional ratings
Review scores
Source	Rating
AllMusic	4.5/5 stars
Chicago Tribune	3.5/4 stars
Robert Christgau	A−
The Encyclopedia of Popular Music	4/5 stars
MusicHound World: The Essential Album Guide	5/5 stars

Robert Christgau called "N'Sel Fik" "rai's most incandescent and universal moment, one of the greatest singles of the decade," writing that "Oran superproducer Rachid [is] outdoing rather than compromising himself as he aims for the bigger time"; Christgau also wrote that he considered the title track to be the single of the year for 1988. The New York Times wrote that "Fadela's voice pours out throaty vulnerability, her notes sliding and breaking in straightforward productions."

The Washington Post praised "Fadela's roughly sensual voice." The Chicago Tribune wrote that the music "builds from a hypnotic minor-key tradition by adding vibrant African and Western dance rhythms, rich French and Spanish melodies, high-tech instrumentation and scandalous lyrics." The Sydney Morning Herald deemed the album "an Arabic music that uses modern instrumentation and pertinent lyrics to upset its own society."

AllMusic noted that "'N'sel Fik', by Fadela and her husband Cheb Sahraoui, is the biggest Algerian hit in the country's history."

== Track listing ==
No.	Title	Length
1.	"N'sel Fik (You Are Mine)"
2.	"Nebki Ouahdi (Crying Alone)"
3.	"Ateni Bniti (Part 1) (Give Me Back My Daughter)"
4.	"Ateni Bniti (Part 2)"
5.	"Ha-Liyaouana Alach (Why Does This Happen to Me)"
6.	"Dja Yadhak (He Came Smiling)"
