= Esraa Warda =

Algerian-American dancer

- Born: Brooklyn, New York City, U.S.
- Citizenship: Algerian, American
- Education: City College of New York
- Occupations: Dancer, educator, cultural curator
- Years active: 2010s–present
- Known for: Preservation and performance of traditional Algerian dance forms
- Notable work: Promotion of Raï, Chaoui and Assimi dance traditions
- Awards: BBC 100 Women (2022)

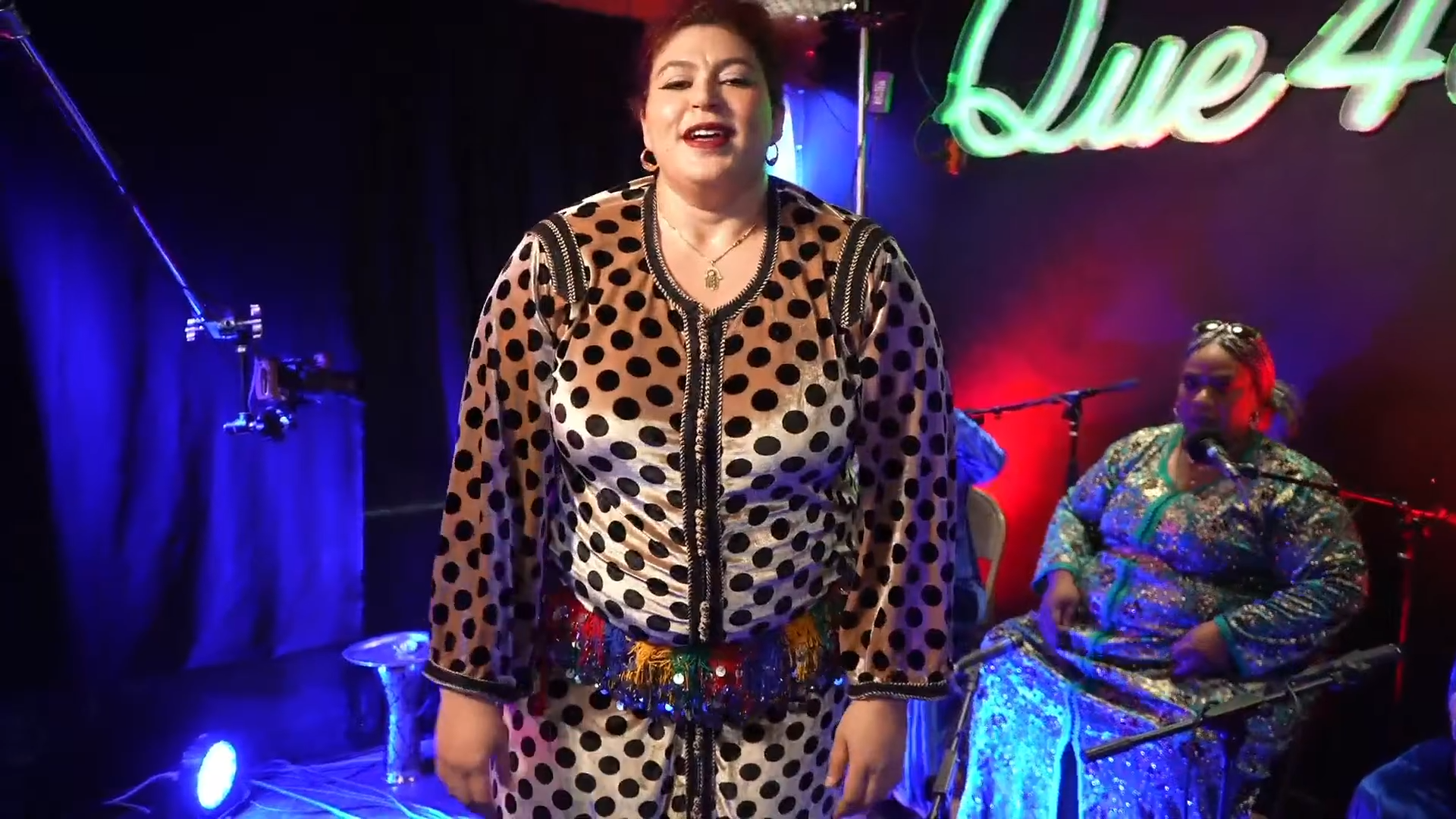
Esraa Warda in 2022

Esraa Warda is an Algerian-American dance performer and educator who specializes in traditional Algerian dance forms Raï, Chaoui, and Assimi.

== Biography ==
Warda was born and raised in Brooklyn, New York City, and is a member of the global Algerian diaspora.

Warda has worked as a co-director of a traditional Arts program at an Arab-American Center in New York. She works to preserve the slowly declining visibility of marginalised Algerian arts, culture and dance. She is a mentee of Algerian musician Cheikha Rabia and women elders in her family. She has also collaborated on music with Salim Beltitane.

Warda has been featured on the PBS show Bare Feet With Mickela Mallozzi, where she spoke about the movement and history of Algerian Raï dance. She also performed internationally, including at the Le Guess Who? Festival in Utrecht, Netherlands, in England and in Cuba.

In 2024, Warda received the Artist Grant from the New York State Council of the Arts. In 2025–2025, she is a Heritage Ambassador Fellow at the Brooklyn Public Library and a Guest Curator at the Center for the Arts at Virginia Tech, Virginia Polytechnic Institute and State University.

She was named a BBC 100 Woman in 2022.
