= Houari Benchenet =

Algerian raï singer (born 1961)

Houari Benchenet (Arabic: هواري بنشنات), born in Oran on May 25, 1961, is an Algerian raï singer.

== Biography ==
A native of El Hamri, in Oran. Benchenet is a member of a large family that has no resources other than song.

In 1975 he began to sing with the derbuka drummer in a group influenced by Blaoui Houari and Ahmed Saber. He recorded his first hit in 1977, with Abdelkader Cassidy, titled "Dalali". His became one of the most prolific tenors of Oran song along with Wahby Ahmed, Blaoui Houari, Ahmed Saber or Benzerga.

Benchenet is part of the second generation of modern rai with Khaled, Cheb Sahraoui and Cheb El Hindi, and Cheb Hamid, replacing Bellemou Messaoud, Belkacem Bouteldja and others. They introduced the synthesizer in the 70 and shattered taboos that revolved around the 1985 Rai Oran.

== Discography ==
=== Albums ===
- 1977: Dalali
- 1989: Dik El Ghadara
- 2001: Arssam wahran
- 2010: Ayetni Trig "8 titles".
- 2013: Wahran El-Bahia "10 titles".

=== Singles ===
- 1977: "Dalali"
- 1983: "Telephone h'rem
- 1983: "Ya aliya al-hem"
- 1983: "Semhili ya ma"
- 1983: "Zid ya l'kawini"
- 1983: "Li Bini w binek mat"
- 1983: "Andi problem"
- 1989: "Goulou ha hiya djat"
- 1989: "Rani m'dammar"
- 1989: "Bakhta"
- 2001: "Arssam wahran"
- 2010: "N'tiya omri ya l'Algerie"
