= Fadela & Sahrawi =

Algerian raï vocal duo

Fadela and Sahraoui were an Algerian raï vocal duo, consisting of Cheb Sahraoui and Chaba Fadela.

The couple married, and their debut record, "N'sel Fik", became an international hit. They separated in the late 1990s. Both artists have since continued their careers as solo performers.
