= Gana El Maghnaoui =

Algerian singer

- Born: Mourad Gana; 2 February 1958 (age 68); Oujda, Maroc
- Genre: Raï
- Occupations: Singer, musician (Arabic, French)
- Instruments: Мiolin, trumpet

Mourad Gana (Arabic: مراد قانا; born 2 February 1958), known professionally as Gana El Maghnaoui (Arabic: قانا المغناوي), is an Algerian raï songwriter, lyricist and composer.

== Biography ==
From Maghnia (Tlemcen Province), Mourad Gana, better known under the name Gana El Maghnaoui, was born 2 February 1958 in Oujda , Maroc . As a musician, he plays the violin as well as the trumpet. His debut in rai music dates back to 1973. He was part of the orchestra of the Oran section of the RTA (1974–1980), then in Algiers. In 1978, he released two EPs and a year later he recorded an 8 track cassette. Noting that it didn't work, he disappeared and resumed in 1986 with the hit Ala ezzergha rani nsel and a cover of Bouteldja Belkacem Milouda fine Kunti, the hit of the year.

== Discography ==
- EP with Boussouar el Maghnaoui (El Anwar, 1977)
- Dayak oulabasse / Salamate salamate with Bellemou Messaoud (El Mehar, 1978)
- Self-titled cassette n. 736 (El Anwar, 1978)
- Self-titled cassette n. 737 (El Anwar, 1978)
- Self-titled cassette n. 822 (El Anwar, 1978)
- Self-titled cassette (Bouarfa, 1978)
- Ha Lamane (CADIC, 1987)
- Best Of (SOLI, 1990s)
- Le roi de la trompette with Messaoud Bellemou (1996)

== Songs ==
- Ala ezzergha rani nsel
- Latamen fi saheb
- Milouda fine Kunti
- Farchili Rani Âyane
- Sid taleb
