= Boussouar El Maghnaoui =

Algerian singer-songwriter

Boussouar El Maghnaoui (born 1955 in Maghnia, Algeria) is an Algerian rai singer-songwriter, considered a pioneer in the genre.

== Biography ==
Born in 1955 in Maghnia (Tlemcen Province), Algeria. His first appearance in rai music dates back to 1974. He has worked with several Algerian rai singers throughout the years, including Bellemou Messaoud, Boutaiba Sghir, Brahim Ounassar, Fadila, Groupe el Azhar, and Groupe Gana. His 1975 version of e song "Zina diri latay", by Kadi Dziri, made him well-known.

== Discography ==
- Khodi brayti / Ya zina diri latay (Hillali, recorded in 1975)
- EP with Gana el Maghnaoui (El Anwar, 1977)
- Dayak oulabasse / Salamate salamate with Bellemou Messaoud (El Mehar, 1978)
- Dayek ou labes / Salamate salamate (Azhar)
- LP with Boutaiba Sghir (Edition MK7)
- LP with Fadila
- Pop Ray (Ouaka, 1986)
- Gouli oui oui (Believe / Brahim Ounassar, 2013)
- Je t'aime l'Algerie (1978)

== Songs ==
- Khla dar mha
- Gouli oui oui
- Ya raiy
- Khali ya khali
- Fakerni besslam
- Baouna hellou lamale
- Mazalki sghira
- Hak chtaytak
- Ya wahrania, waldik fakou bya
- El-Djazair
- Sonatrach
- Je t'aime l'Algerie
- Diri lataye
