= Oulmes, Morocco =

Oulmes أولماس ⵓⵍⵎⴰⵙ
- Town
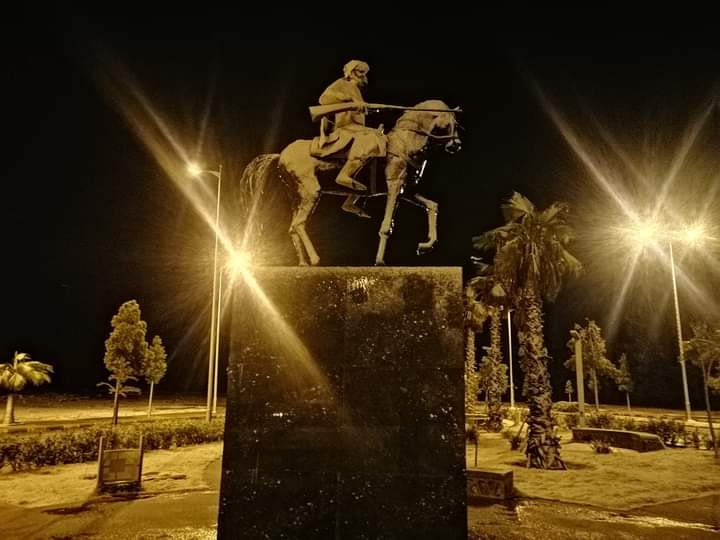
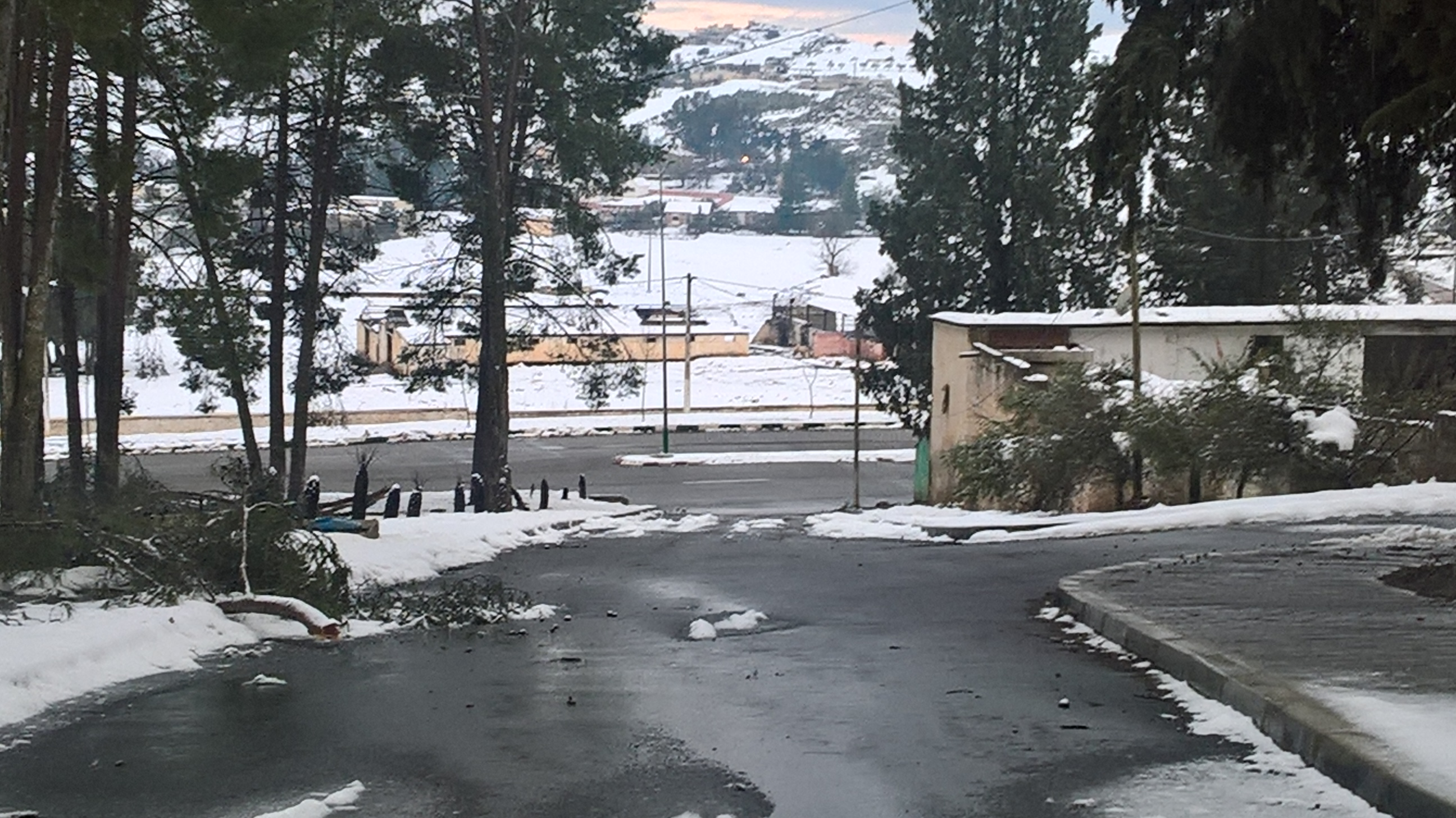
- Interactive map of Oulmes
- Coordinates: 33°26′10″N 6°0′4″W
- Country: Morocco
- Region: Rabat-Salé-Kénitra
- Province: Khemisset

Population (2004)
  - Total: 9,460
- Time zone: UTC+0 (GMT)

Oulmes (أولماس, ⵓⵍⵎⴰⵙ) is a town and rural commune in Khémisset Province, Rabat-Salé-Kénitra, Morocco. At to the 2004 census, its population was 9,460.

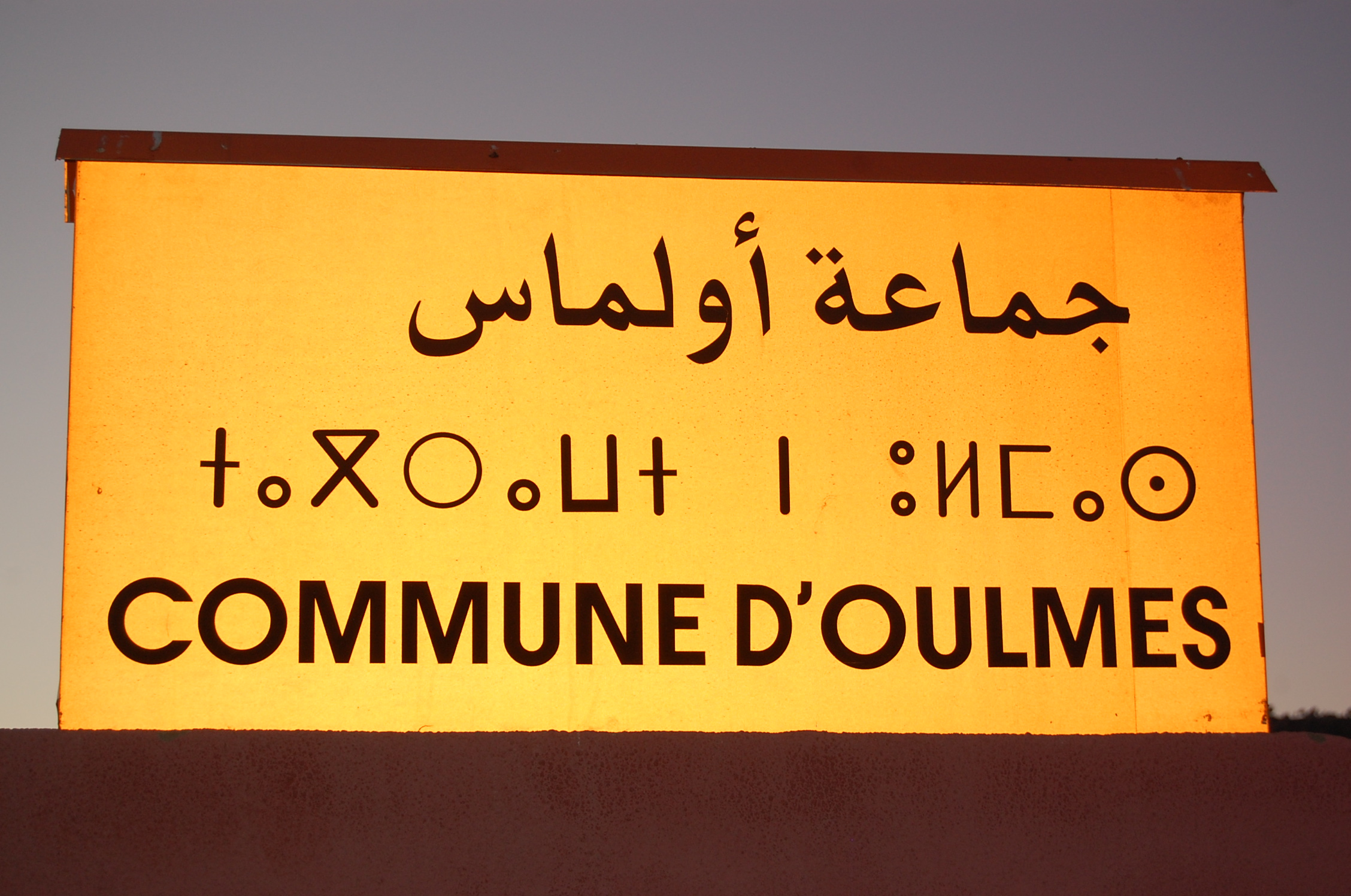
Road sign

== Notable people ==
- Cheb, singer and musician.
- Mahjoubi Aherdane, politician and Amazigh activist/poet.
