= Abderrahmane Mahjoub =

Footballer (1929–2011)

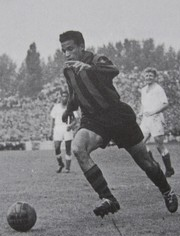

Personal information
- Date of birth: 25 April 1929
- Place of birth: Casablanca, French Morocco
- Date of death: 31 August 2011 (aged 82)
- Place of death: Casablanca, Morocco
- Position: Midfielder

Youth career
- US Marocaine

Senior career*
Years	Team	Apps	(Gls)
1948–1951	US Athlétique Casablanca		
1951–1953	RC Paris	52	(14)
1953–1954	Nice	30	(3)
1954–1960	RC Paris	86	(15)
1960–1963	Montpellier	99	(39)
1963–1964	RC Paris	15	(3)
1964–1968	Wydad Casablanca		

International career
1953–1955	France	7	(0)
1960–1963	Morocco	4	(1)

Managerial career
- 1963–1967: Morocco
- 1972–1973: Morocco
- * Club domestic league appearances and goals

Abderrahmane Mahjoub or Abderrahmane Belmahjoub (Arabic: عبد الرحمن بلمحجوب; 25 April 1929 – 31 August 2011) was a French and Moroccan international football midfielder.

Known as Prince du Parc (Prince of the Park) in his playing days for his dominant control of the midfield, he was regarded as one of the best Arab players of his generation, and one of the few who graced the sports fields of Europe in the 1950s and 1960s.

== Career ==
Born in Casablanca, the young Mahjoub began playing on the streets of his home city with his brother Mohamed, who later played for Olympique Marseille in the late 1940s. Abderrahmane started his career with the Union Sportive Athlétique Casablanca in 1948, where he spent three seasons before moving to Europe to join RC Paris of the French first division, but it was his performances for OGC Nice in 1953 that caught the eye of French selectors making his international debut against Luxembourg in a World Cup Qualifier. He stepped out at the Parc des Princes stadium in Paris in the blue of France alongside his Nice teammate Moroccan-born Just Fontaine. The midfielder was an instant success on his first appearance, assisting in the first goal in an 8–0 rout in only the second minute of the game, Mahjoub went on to play six other occasions for France including a 3–2 win over Mexico at the 1954 FIFA World Cup in Switzerland along with another Arab, Algerian Abdelaziz Bentifour.

After a season with Nice, where he was part of a French Cup winning side beating Larbi Ben Barek’s Olympique Marseille in the final, he rejoined Racing Club spending six successful seasons at the Paris club, reaching high as third place in the French first division in two consecutive seasons in 1958 and 1959. At the age of 31, the club thought the Moroccan’s best years were behind him, and let him go but he proved all his critics wrong by guiding SO Montpellier to the 1961 French Second Division title, and promotion to the top flight. Racing Club eventually bought back the player for a final season in 1963, before he returned to play for Wydad Casablanca, where he was later coach.

One of the greatest moments in his career came in a memorable 1962 World Cup Qualifier; when Abderrahman captained his native country Morocco against the star-studded Spain national team of Alfredo Di Stefano, Ferenc Puskás, and Francisco Gento, before stepping onto the pitch he told his teammates to look at the flags of the two nations, planted in the ground at the same height “I want you to be like these flags, on the same level as the Spaniards”. Spain knocked out the Moroccan side but everyone at the time admired the Moroccan side for their style of play and their effort against the Spaniards. Abderrahman would later go on to coach the Moroccan national team.

In 2006, he was selected by CAF as one of the best 200 African football players of the last 50 years. He died on 31 August 2011.

== Personal life ==
Mahjoub was married to the Algerian singer and actress Leila Al Jazairia.
