= Blaoui Houari =

Algerian musician

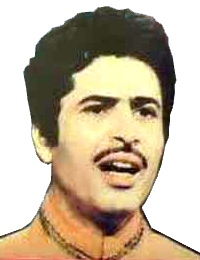
- Born: 23 January 1926; Oran, French Algeria
- Died: 19 July 2017 (aged 91); Oran, Algeria
- Resting place: Ain El Beida cemetery, Oran, Algeria
- Occupation(s): Singer-songwriter, composer, conductors

Blaoui Houari (Arabic: بلاوي الهواري Blawī al-Hwārī; 23 January 1926 – 19 July 2017) was an Algerian singer-songwriter, composer and conductor. Over the course of his career, he recorded over 900 songs and released over 100 albums.

== Early life ==
Blaoui Houari was born on 23 January 1926 in Oran, Western Algeria, then French Algeria. His father, who owned a bar in Oran, played the Kwitra. Houari left school at 13 to work for his father.

== Career ==
Houari began his career as a singer-songwriter in the 1940s, when he first played music at weddings and circumcision ceremonies. He also composed songs and played the piano, the guitar, the mandolin and the accordion. He released his first album in 1955, which included a cover of Benyekhlef Boutaleb's song Rani M’hayer. In 1986, he released Dikrayat Wahran, an album about Oran. Over the course of his career, he recorded over 900 songs and released over 100 albums.

With Ahmed Wahby, Houari co-founded El Asri, a musical style which blended traditional Arab music with Bedouin rhythm and Oranian dialect. For example, he turned Abdelkader El-Khaldi's poems into songs.

During the Algerian War, Houari was arrested by the French army and detained in Sig for his pro-Algerian songs. When Algeria became an independent nation in 1962, he became the head of Oran's public radio and television stations. In 1970, he conducted the Algerian National Orchestra at Expo '70 in Osaka, Japan.

== Death and legacy ==
Houari died on 19 July 2017 in Oran, at the age of 91. He was buried in Oran's Ain El Beida cemetery.

Houari is considered as the "precursor of raï music." Indeed, his music influenced many raï performers, including Khaled, who covered some of his songs, as well as Houari Benchenet and Cheb Mami.
