= Abdel Ali Slimani =

Algerian singer

Abdel Ali Slimani (Arabic عبد العلي سليماني, Algiers) is an Algerian raï singer.

== Life ==
Jazz Times described his 1996 album Mraya "an impressive debut" being noted by others for his song Moi et Toi. Slimani's rai steers clear of suggestive content and bad language and is as Slimani says "family music" heard on the radio in Algeria even in the 1990s.
