= Leila Al Jazairia =

Algerian singer and actress (1927–2026)

Leila Al Jazairia (Arabic: ليلى الجزائرية; August 6, 1927 – April 15, 2026) was an Algerian singer and actress.

== Biography ==
Leila Al Jazairia was born Leïla Hakim in Oran, Algeria, in 1927.

As a singer, she was initially discovered by the Algerian artist Mahieddine Bachtarzi and began her career in her home country. She then spent time performing in Paris, where she was noticed by the Egyptian singer Farid al-Atrash. In the early 1950s, she traveled with his encouragement to Egypt, where she gained prominence as a singer and actress. It was there that she adopted the stage name Leila Al Jazairia.

Her film career began in 1952, when she appeared in Atrash's film Ayza Atgawwez ("I Want to Get Married"). In 1953, she was featured alongside Kamal el-Shennawi in the film The Unwilling Doctor, then performed again with Atrash in his 1954 film Lahn hubi. While her brief career as an actress came to an end after that, she had played a notable role in the "golden age" of Arab musical filmmaking.

Al Jazairia then met and married the Moroccan soccer star Abderrahmane Mahjoub, after which she stepped away from the spotlight. They settled for many years in Paris, where they ran a restaurant for a period, and were together until his death in 2011. She died in 2026 at age 97, at home in Casablanca.
