= Cheikha Rabia =

Algerian singer

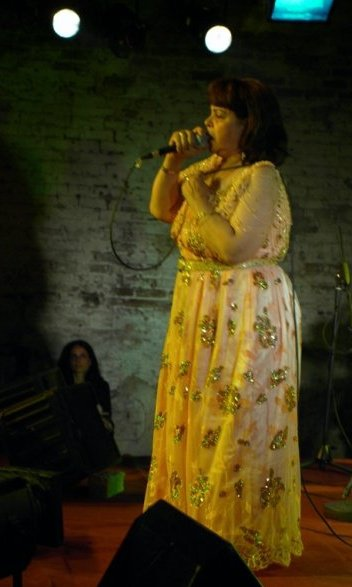
- Cheikha Rabia

Background information
- Origin: Relizane, Algeria
- Genres: Raï, rock, electronic
- Occupations: Singer, songwriter
- Instruments: Tambourine, voice, galal, gasba, electric guitar, drums, bass
- Years active: 1955–present
- Labels: Virgin, Buda music/Tiferet Records, Dinamyte

Cheikha Rabia is an Algerian singer.

== Early life ==
She was born in Relizane (near Oran) in Algeria in 1944, a city near Oran. Rabia is the daughter of a barber (a veteran of World War I) and a seamstress from Kabylie. She began singing at 11 years old after discovering the traditional female Algerian singers called "Meddehates", who traditionally sing songs of lust and primarily performed in rural celebrations for an exclusively female audience. The songs were considered crude and unfit to be heard in polite society.

The title of Cheikha (transl. "mistress of voice") was given to Rabia when she was 18 years old. 'A new popular music was born between women voices playing percussion as the meddehates meet the flutes of 'cheikh' as Eliane Azoulay. She was portrayed in 2001 by directors Stéphane Ballouhey, Bertrand Roelandt. Cheikha Rabia sings the Raï with two traditional flutes whose sounds reflect a Bedouin past.

== Musical influences ==
=== Roots of Raï ===
From the 1960s, she sang in Algiers cabarets where it is succeeded with an exclusively male audience. She emigrated to France in 1977 with her husband and eight children and began singing in Paris, where she acquired a bistro in Paris while continuing to perform in small cabarets as a Raï singer. After her divorce she stopped singing in order to focus on raising her children. Five years later, children grown, she sold her café and began to sing on weekends. After successful recordings in Algeria, she recorded an album in 1999 on Virgin with a powerful title, Ana Hak, followed by a European tour. Rabia alternated passages in renowned festivals with cultural centers in suburban bistros or concert venues. 'This music born in Oran and performed in Paris is deep rooted to desire gloomy feelings', Véronique Mortaigne reviewed. 'Isn't Rabia's singing the best omen to unite human minds? The sixty years old lady always sung love with a raw and passionate flame', stated Farac C from l'Humanite Review.

=== Rabia ===
The idea for a new musical structure in her Raï cam when Rabia met producer musician Dinah Douieb in 2005 at a "Music Night of Ramadan in a Paris bistro. Rabia realized how much her voice and her personality could captivate rock musicians and electronic music producers. She signed with the label Tiferet(e) in 2006 and recorded with Dinah an album of Roots Raï 'Liberti with Bouda musique. In 2012, at age 68 Rabia recorded another album, drawing inspiration from Black Sabbath mixed with funk grooves including hip hop beats, and drum and bass. The group included guitarist Yan Pechin and electric guitar & producer Dinah Douieb, with bassist/remixer Niktus.

== Discography ==
- Ana Hak (1999)
- Liberti (2007)
- RABIA (2012)
