= Bouteldja Belkacem =

Algerian raï songwriter and composer

- Born: 5 April 1947; Oran, Algeria
- Died: 1 September 2015 (aged 68)
- Genres: Raï
- Occupation(s): Singer, musician
- Years active: 1964–2015

Bouteldja Belkacem (5 April 1947 – 1 September 2015 in Oran) was an Algerian raï songwriter, lyricist and composer.

== Biography ==
Bouteldja Belkacem grew up in the El Hamri neighborhood of Oran in Algeria. He is considered a pillar of modern raï. One of those who modernized the raï with Messaoud Bellemou, in the 1960s, he began to use the accordion in place of the zamr, which allowed a rai performer to play and sing at the same time. But since the accordion could not play quarter tones, Bouteldja transformed it by changing the length of the strips of metal inside, making it compatible with the traditional Algerian melodic system.

On 9 December 1965, he recorded his first tape at Brahim El Feth's, followed by a disk with two hits. In 1968, his editor left for Paris, and Belkacem Bouteldja to honor his contract had an obligation to go back and forth to record three discs. In late 1969 his encounter with Messaoud Bellemou upset the traditional raï; their 1974 record marked the effective birth of pop-raï. Their collaboration endured until the end of 1979. Bouteldja withdrew for a while returning in 1985, for the first held Rai Festival in Oran, with representatives of the new wave such as Cheb Khaled, Hamid and many others.

In 1993, summarizing the history of rai, Belkacem Bouteldja would say: "Life is like that. To each his own time: Cheikh Hamada in the 30s, Rimitti in the 50s, Bouteldja in the 60s, Bellemou in the 70s, Khaled in the 80s, Hasni and Nasro in the 90s."

== Discography ==
- Gatlek Zizia (????, 1965)
- Hadi França / Li Bik Bia (Chandor, 1967)
- Milouda / Serbili baoui (Chandor, 1966) (Casaphone, 1970)

== Songs ==
- Milouda
- Gatlek Zizia (Cheikha El Wachma cover)
- Serbili baoui
- Ya Rayi
- Hiya Hiya Wahrania
- Sidi el Hakem
- Taliya Rabi Bik Blani
