= Raïna Raï =

Algerian raï band

Raïna Raï راينا راي
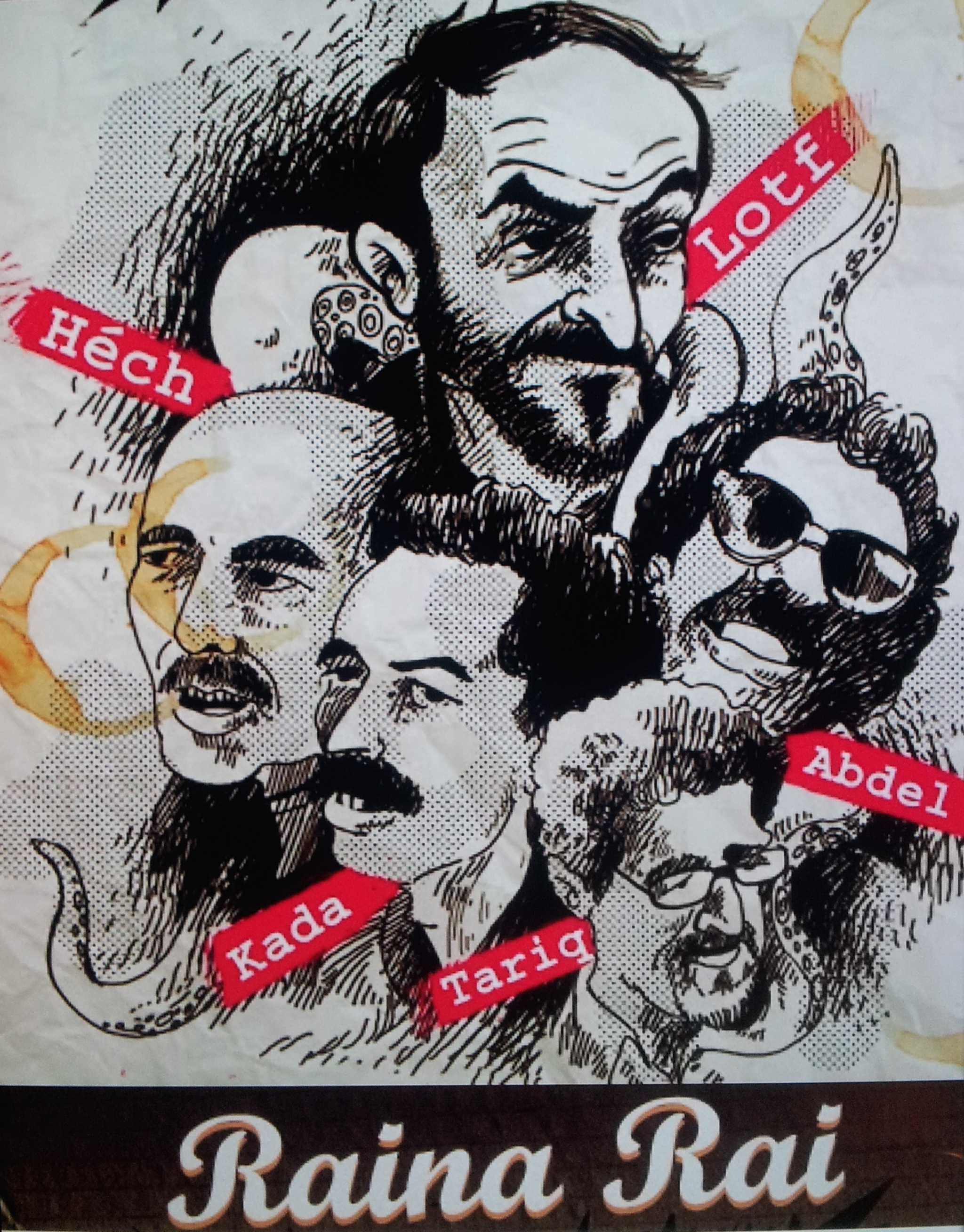
- logo of the band

Background information
- Origin: Sidi Bel-Abbes, Algeria
- Genres: Raï, rock
- Years active: 1980–
- Labels: Sadi Disques (France); HTK Productions (France); Edition Rachid & Fethi (Algeria); Musidisc (France)
- Members: Amine Dahane; Samir Mrabet; Lotfi Attar; Hachemi Djellouli; Abderahmane Dendane; Kada Guebbache; Amine Nouaoui
- Past members: Tarik Naïmi Chikhi; Kaddour Bouchentouf; Abdellah Terkmani; Djilali Rezkallah

Raïna Raï, (Arabic: راينا راي) is an Algerian raï band from Sidi Bel Abbès. It formed in 1980 in Paris and continues to this day.
The founding members are Tarik Naïmi Chikhi, Kaddour Bouchentouf, Lotfi Attar and Hachemi Djellouli.

== History ==
The group was established in December 1980 in Paris.

== Members ==
- Kada Guebbache: Vocal & Karkabou
- Hachemi Djellouli: Percussions
- Lotfi Attar: Former guitar player
- Reda Gherici: Vocal & Bass guitar
- Abderahmane Dendane: Saxophone
- Nadjib Gherici: Guitare

== Discography ==
=== Albums ===
- Raina Rai, 1982, Sadi Disques.
- Hagda, 1983, auto-production (HTK Productions) two titles were used in the original soundtrack of the film Tchao Pantin of Claude Berri featuring Coluche.
- Rana Hna, 1985, Edition Rachid & Fethi.
- Mama, 1988, Edition Rachid & Fethi.
- Zaama, 1992, Musidisc.
- Bye Bye, 2001, Lazer Production.

=== Live albums ===
- Live in Algiers, 1985, youth festival in Riad El-Feth with Touré Kunda.
- Live in Paris, 1986 in La Villette, auto-production Sadi Disques.
- Live in Quebec, 1987 with Manu Dibango.
- Live in Marrakech, 1987.
- Tour in United States & au Canada, 1991 in Washington, D.C., Boston, Montreal, New York City and San Francisco.
- Live in Frankfurt, 1992, Panafricain festival with Alpha Blondy.
- Live in Algiers, 2000 20th anniversary of Raïna Raï.
- Live in Paris, 2002, registered in Le Divan du Monde.
- Live in Casablanca, 2005.
- Live in Oran, 2008, édition AS.

== Gallery ==
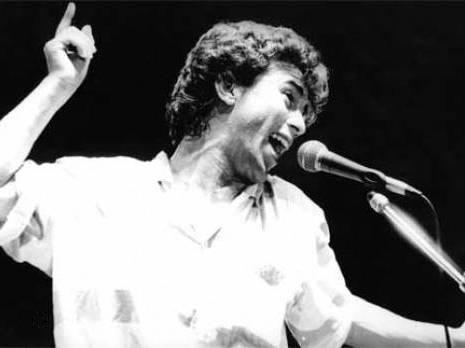
Djilali Rezkallah

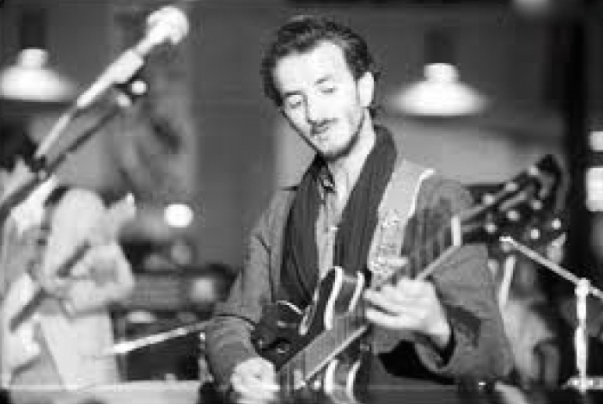
Lotfi Attar

Djilali Rezkallah & Lotfi Attar
