= Houari Manar =

Algerian raï singer (1981–2019)

Houari Manar هواري منار
- Born: Houari Madani; 18 December 1981; Oran, Algeria
- Died: 7 January 2019 (aged 37) Hydra, Algeria
- Genres: Raï, pop
- Occupation: Singer
- Years active: 2000–2018
- Labels: Édition Saint Crépain; Sun House

Houari Manar (Arabic: هواري منار; born Houari Madani, هواري مدني; 18 December 1981 – 7 January 2019) was an Algerian raï singer who was popular in his home country as well as the neighbouring Maghreb and Mediterranean countries, and in France.

== Early life ==
Houari Manar was born Houari El Madani in Oran into a family with 12 brothers and sisters. His mother was a popular meddahate singer; a traditional folk music performer at festivals and weddings. Two of his brothers, Cheb Massaro and Cheb Larbi, are also raï singers. The family moved to Marseille, France, when he was four. In his youth, he was inspired, in part, by singers such as Celine Dion, Mariah Carey, and Francis Cabrel.

== Career ==
In 2003, Manar moved back to Algeria to begin a career as a raï singer; a form of Algerian folk music that dates back to the 1920s. He recorded two successful singles, "Cha dani bent nass" and "Kima ndirlek ma terdhach" with the Edition Saint Crépain label. In 2006, he recorded his first album Aâchkek mon traitement with Cheb Kader. The album was a blend of upbeat raï and modern pop music.

Manar became widely popular throughout the Mediterranean and caused a degree of controversy during his career. In 2014, during the Muslim holy month of Ramadan, he was photographed kissing another man at a music venue in Algiers where he was performing, angering religious fundamentalists. The organizer of the concert had to issue an apology to those who were offended and Manar's subsequent performance was cancelled. Manar's career continued to suffer from the backlash against his flamboyant persona and thinly veiled homosexuality. In 2017, he was due to perform at an event organised by the National Office of Culture and Information to mark the sixty-third anniversary of the beginning of the Algerian War of Independence. When news of his participation was released, his upcoming performance was met with renewed controversy on social media and he was later dropped from the line-up of performers. He was subsequently banned from performing on both state and privately owned television stations in Algeria.

Although some of his songs strongly alluded to his homosexuality, Manar never publicly came out as gay (though never denying it) and defended himself from critics, telling Le Monde in 2015, "My raï is a proper raï. Everything I sing I sing in front of families, of children and old people. I am not one of those people who sing about vulgarities. I am a respected artist."

== Death ==
On 7 January 2019, Manar died of a heart attack at a private clinic in Hydra while undergoing liposuction. He was 37 years old.

== Discography ==
- Aâchkek mon traitement (2006)
- Zaâzat biya sass el mahna (2007)
- Basta (2015)
- Wala fel ahlem we ygoulek je t’aime (2018)
- Ana li gabertah (2018)
