= Cheb Nasro =

Nasro
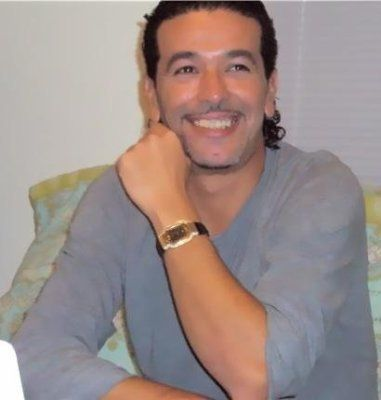
- Cheb Nasro

Background information
- Born: Nasereddine Souïdi; 30 November 1969 (age 55); Aïn Témouchent, Algeria
- Genres: Raï
- Occupations: Musician; singer-songwriter
- Years active: 1987–present
- Labels: Disco Maghreb; Miles Copeland ARK21; Mondo Melodia; Rotana Records

Nasereddine Souïdi (Arabic: نصر الدين اسويدي, born 30 November 1969), known as Cheb Nasro and after Nasro (Arabic:نصرو) is raï's most prolific artist with more than 131 albums to his credit.

== Biography ==
Nasro was born Nasereddine Souidi in Aïn Témouchent and then grew up in the western Algerian city of Oran. His first foray into music came at the age of two. Despite competition, Nasro and Cheb Hasni became close friends. Hope of Nasro's early career began to fade after the tragic murder of Cheb Hasni on September 29, 1994. While Raï many artists emigrated to Europe or North America, he was one of the few to continue singing in his homeland.
