= Chaba Fadela =

Algerian raï musician and actress

- Born: Fadela Zalmat; 25 February 1962 (age 64); Oran, Algeria
- Occupations: Singer; actress
- Years active: 1978—present
- Spouse: Cheb Sahraoui
- Musical career
- Genres: Raï; rock
- Instrument: Vocals
- Labels: Island; Rotana

Chaba Fadela (born Fadela Zalmat, 5 February 1962) is an Algerian raï musician and actress.

== Early life ==
Fadela was raised in a poor neighborhood in Oran, Algeria, and starred in the Algerian film Djalti at the age of 14. She launched her musical career as a singer in Boutiba S'ghir's band and began recording with producer Rachid Baba Ahmed in the late 1970s. She was the first woman to defy the ban on women singing in clubs, and she quickly reached great success in Algeria.

== Personal life ==
She met and married Cheb Sahraoui, and the pair began recording together as a duo, starting in 1983 with "N'sel Fik (You Are Mine)", which became one of the first international raï hit records. An album, You Are Mine, was released by Mango/Island Records in 1988. Fadela and Sahraoui toured internationally and recorded widely in the 1980s, with further success. While in New York in 1993, they recorded the album Walli with producer and multi-instrumentalist Bill Laswell. They relocated from Algeria to France in 1994.

In the late 1990s, the professional and personal relationship between Fadela and Sahraoui broke down, and since then Fadela has continued to work as a solo singer.

== Further information and main sources ==
- AMG entry
- Further information
