= Cheikha Rimitti =

Algerian raï singer (1923–2006)

Cheikha Rimitti الشيخة الرّيميتي
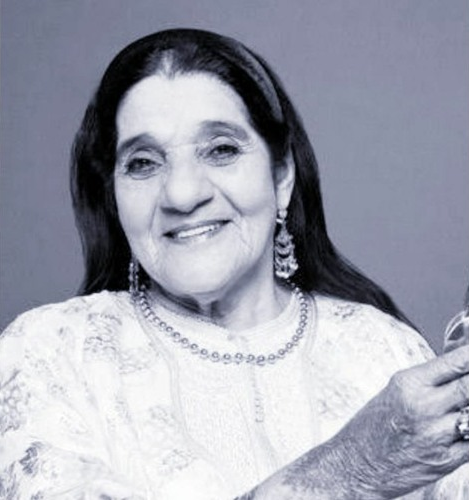

Background information
- Also known as: Cheikha Rimitti
- Born: Saadia El Ghizania; 8 May 1923; Tessala, Algeria
- Origin: Tessala, Algeria
- Died: 15 May 2006 (aged 83) Paris, France
- Genres: Raï
- Occupations: Singer, instrumentalist
- Instruments: Gaspa, guellal (traditional), drums, violin
- Years active: 40s–2006

Cheikha Rimitti (Arabic: شيخة ريميتي; 8 May 1923 – 15 May 2006), born Saadia El Ghizania (سعدية الغيزانية), was an Algerian raï female singer.

== Early life ==
Cheikha Rimitti was born in Tessala, a small village in western Algeria in 1923. She is from the major Berber tribe Beni Ouragh. She had been orphaned as a child due to violent French occupation and began to live rough, earning a few francs working in the fields and doing other manual jobs.

== Early musical career ==
At age 15, she joined a troupe of traditional Algerian musicians and learnt to sing and dance. In 1943 she moved to the rural town of Relizane and began writing her own songs. Her songs described the tough life endured by the Algerian poor, focusing on everyday struggle of living, pleasures of sex, love, alcohol and friendship and the realities of war.

Traditionally, songs of lust had been sung privately by Algerian women at rural wedding celebrations but were considered crude and unfit to be heard in polite society. Rimitti was one of the first to sing them in public and did so in the earthy language of the street, using a rich blend of slang and local language. She eventually composed more than 200 songs but remained illiterate all her life.

== Recognition across Algeria ==
Her fame spread by word of mouth across Algeria during the Second World War until she was taken under the patronage of a well-known Algerian musician of the time, Cheikh Mohammed Ould Ennems, who took her to Algiers where she made her first radio broadcasts. Soon after, she adopted the name Cheikha Rimitti.

She made her first record in 1952, a three-track on Pathé Records under the name Cheikha Remettez Reliziana, which included the famous Er-Raï Er-Raï. This was not to be the record that launched her career, however. That came two years later when Rimitti caused a sensation with the release of Charrak Gattà a daring hit record, which encouraged young women to lose their virginity and which scandalised Muslim orthodoxy. Her outlook and songs did not endear her to the nationalist forces fighting for freedom from French rule during the Algerian War of Independence who denounced her for singing folklore perverted by colonialism.

When Algeria won its independence in 1962, the Government banned her from radio and television for doing broadcasts under French control during the independence struggle. However her songs remained hugely popular with the working-class poor and she continued to sing privately at weddings and feasts.

== Recognition outside Algeria and by other artists ==
By the 1970s, she was performing mostly for the Algerian immigrant community in France. Briefly returning to Algeria in 1971, she was badly hurt in a car crash in which three of her musicians were killed.

Four years later she went on a hadj to Mecca, after which her lifestyle (though not her songs or subject matter) changed. She stopped smoking and drinking, but continued her singing and dancing, and by the mid-80s, when Rai was becoming established as the rousing dance music of angry young Algerians, Rimitti was being hailed as la mamie du Rai, the grandmother of the style. Her deep singing voice, in the male tenor range, was recognizable throughout the Algerian community on both sides of the Mediterranean.

In 1978, Cheikha Rimitti moved to Paris, loosening her ties with the Algerian authorities but never cutting herself off from the Algerian people, her first fans.

== Later life and death ==
Her music crossed over to the West and she undertook prestigious concerts in big cities and worldwide capitals as well as collaborating with Robert Fripp and Flea from the Red Hot Chili Peppers on the "Sidi Mansour" LP in 1994, inaugurating a new electric form of raï.

Her back catalogue was rediscovered by a new generation raï successors including Khaled who has covered "The Camel". Many singers of the new generation venerated her as "The Mother of the Genre" and Rachid Taha dedicated a song to her, "Rimitti".

Her most recent album N'ta Goudami, released in 2006, was a lustful combination of traditional Algerian and modern rock sounds sung in a deep voice of booming energy that belied her 83 years and garnered enthusiastic reviews . For someone who had been officially banned in Algeria, Rimitti marked rai history by taking the defiant step of recording her last album at the Boussif Studios in Oran.

She continued performing until the end – two days before she died she was rapturously received by an audience of 4,500 at the Zénith in Paris.

She died in Paris from a heart attack on 15 May 2006, aged 83.

== Selected discography ==
Over a 50-year period she recorded over 400 cassettes, 300 singles, 50-something 78rpms and the handful of CDs. A selected CD discography can be found below:

- Ghir al Baroud (1996)
- Sidi Mansour (1994) with Flea (Red Hot Chili Peppers), Robert Fripp (King Crimson) and other.
- Cheika (1996) with Flea (Red Hot Chili Peppers), Robert Fripp (King Crimson) and other.
- Trab Music (2000)
- Nouar (2000)
- L'etoile du Rai (2001)
- Live European Tour 2000 (2001)
- Salam Maghreb (2001)
- N'ta Goudami (2006)
