= Rachid Baba Ahmed =

Algerian record producer, composer, and singer

Rachid Baba Ahmed رشيد بابا أحمد
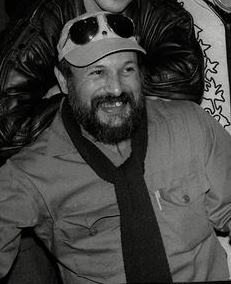

Background information
- Born: 20 August 1946; Tlemcen, Algeria
- Died: 15 February 1995 (aged 48); Oran, Algeria
- Genres: Raï
- Occupations: Record producer; Musician; Composer; Singer
- Years active: 1960s–1995

Rachid Baba Ahmed (Arabic: رشيد بابا أحمد; 20 August 1946–15 February 1995) was an Algerian record producer, composer, and singer involved in the regional genre known as raï. He was credited with the international popularization of the genre in 1976, through the new pop raï, with a delicate and sophisticated blend of electronic instrumentation. He was also credited with the development of pop raï during the 1970s and 1980s,^{1} the performers of which are called cheb or chaba.

== Career ==
Rachid Baba produced an album titled Rai Rebels, among many other acclaimed titles released in the United States and elsewhere. He was quoted as saying, with regards to censoring the lyrics to the songs on the albums in order to make them appropriate for observant Islamic audiences, "In the beginning, I let [a] cheb sing the words as he wanted. Now I pay attention. When he sings a vulgarity, I say stop. If he doesn’t obey, I cut it during the mixing." Baba helped many young and upcoming artists, including Chaba Fadela and Cheb Sahraoui. Ahmed’s modern 24-track studio in Tlemcen produced Algerian pop-raï.

== Death ==
During the Algerian Civil War, he was murdered by Islamic fundamentalists on February 15, 1995, outside of his record store in Oran, Algeria. He had been a long-standing target for the Islamic movements because of his involvement in the production of songs with themes of romance and everyday living.

== Notes ==
1. Amazon.com
