= Cheba Zahouania =

Algerian singer (born 1959)

- Born: Halima Mazzi; May 15, 1959 (age 67); Oran, Algeria
- Citizenship: Algerian
- Occupation: Singer
- Years active: 1981–present
- Notable work: "Khâli ya khâli" (1986); "Beraka" (1987)
- Musical career
- Genre: Raï
- Instruments: Vocals; tar; darbuka
- Labels: Mango; Island

Cheba Zahouania (Arabic: الشابة الزهوانية) (also spelled Chaba), born Halima Mazzi (Arabic: حليمة مازي) (born May 15, 1959) is an Algerian singer known for raï music. She has lived in France since her singing partner, Cheb Hasni, was murdered in 1994.

== Biography ==
Halima Mazzi was born in Oran, Algeria, in 1959. Under the name Chaba Zahouania, she became a popular singer of raï, a hybrid folk-music style. In 1986, five years after the start of her career, she achieved recognition with her performance of "Khâli ya khâli" (My uncle, oh, my uncle) with Cheb Hamid.

During the summer of 1987, Zahouania recorded "Beraka" ("The Shack"), with Cheb Hasni, which was considered provocative by Algerian standards, which got them attention. The success of the song made Hasni famous and added to Zahouania's fame, although the song remained controversial with critics and Islamic fundamentalists, who were already concerned over the popularity of the raï genre.

Hasni was murdered in Oran on 29 September 1994. Zahouania left Algeria and went to live in France. She was able to return in 1999 and recorded in Algeria, including a duet with Cheb Abdou. In 2006, she started to sing about religious subjects after being invited to Mecca on her first pilgrimage by President Abdelaziz Bouteflika. Although she dislikes politics, she did join with other raï singers to create a support committee for Abdelaziz Bouteflika in 2009.

== Selected discography ==
- H Bibi Darha Biya (2003)
- El baraka (2002)
- Zahouania (2001)
- Samahni ya zine (2000)
- Rhythm n Raï (1997)
- Formule Raï (1995)
- Nights without Sleeping (1988)
- Rachid System Feat. Rim'K
- Wourini Win Rak Tergoud
- Mazelt fi lbal
- Ya Lala Torkia
- Amitiés Sacrée featuring TLF
- La Route du Soleil featuring Rim'K
