= Cheb Hasni =

Algerian raï singer (1968–1994)

Cheb Hasni حسني شقرون
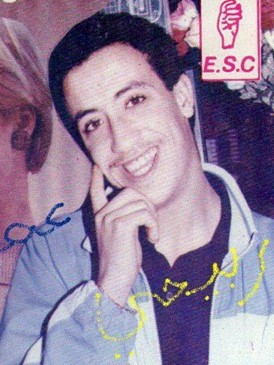
- Hasni in 1986

Background information
- Born: Hasni Chakroun; 1 February 1968; Oran, Algeria
- Origin: Gambetta, Oran
- Died: 29 September 1994 (aged 26); Oran, Algeria
- Genres: Raï
- Occupation: Singer
- Years active: 1986–1994
- Spouse: Malika Zahzouh (m. 1987)

Cheb Hasni (Arabic: الشاب حسني), born Hasni Chakroun (Arabic: حسني شقرون), (1 February 1968 – 29 September 1994), was an Algerian raï singer. Regarded as "The King of Sentimental Music","le rossignol du raï", his contribution to music made him one of the most celebrated Algerian artist of the late 20th century. He was popular across the Maghreb, having reached the height of his career in the late 1980s and early 1990s.

== Life and career ==
=== Early life ===
Cheb Hasni was born on February 1, 1968, in Oran, Algeria into a working-class family. His father was a welder and his mother a homemaker, he was one of seven children. He was a football player, starting at the age of 9 in a local club in Oran named ASMO. At the age of 15, he got injured and stayed in the hospital for several weeks. When he returned to the field, his weight had increased, and despite the encouragement of his coaches, he couldn't continue his sports career. In addition to his passion for football, Hasni displayed an early interest in music. In an interview published in the French newspaper Libération in 1992, Hasni recounted how "everyone knew me in our neighbourhood when I was a kid. I was always walking up the road with my school bag thrown off my shoulder, singing my head off".

=== Entry into the music scene and controversy ===
Hasni's first significant performance as a singer occurred when he attended a local wedding party, where the group led by the famous Naoui brothers was playing. Impressed by his voice, they invited him to perform on stage at a well-known cabaret, La Guinguette. The second major launching point in Hasni's career came shortly afterwards when a producer asked him to record with Raï performer Chaba Zahouania.

In 1987, the pair released a provocative song by Algerian standards, "Beraka" ("The Shack"), which contained lyrics about drunken sexual intercourse, gaining them much attention. The success of "Beraka" made Hasni famous, and a controversial subject with both critics and fundamentalists already concerned over the popularity of the Raï genre.

=== Personal life ===
He got married in 1987 at the age of 19 and had only one child named Abdellah, born in 1989. His wife, whose real name is Zahzouh Malika known as "Melouka", was the main inspiration for his greatest hits over the years, such as "Tal Ghyabek ya ghzali" and "El Bayda mon amour".

=== International recognition and performances ===
Like many other Raï artists based in Algeria, Cheb Hasni was also performing abroad (giving concerts everywhere from Paris, Marseille, and Boston to Washington, D.C., Tunis, Casablanca, and Tokyo, to name a few cities), more than at home, due to curfews and musical restrictions in Algeria at the time. Hasni's last concert in his native country was in 1993, when he performed to an audience of over 150,000 fans in Algiers at an event organized to celebrate the thirty-first anniversary of Algeria's independence.

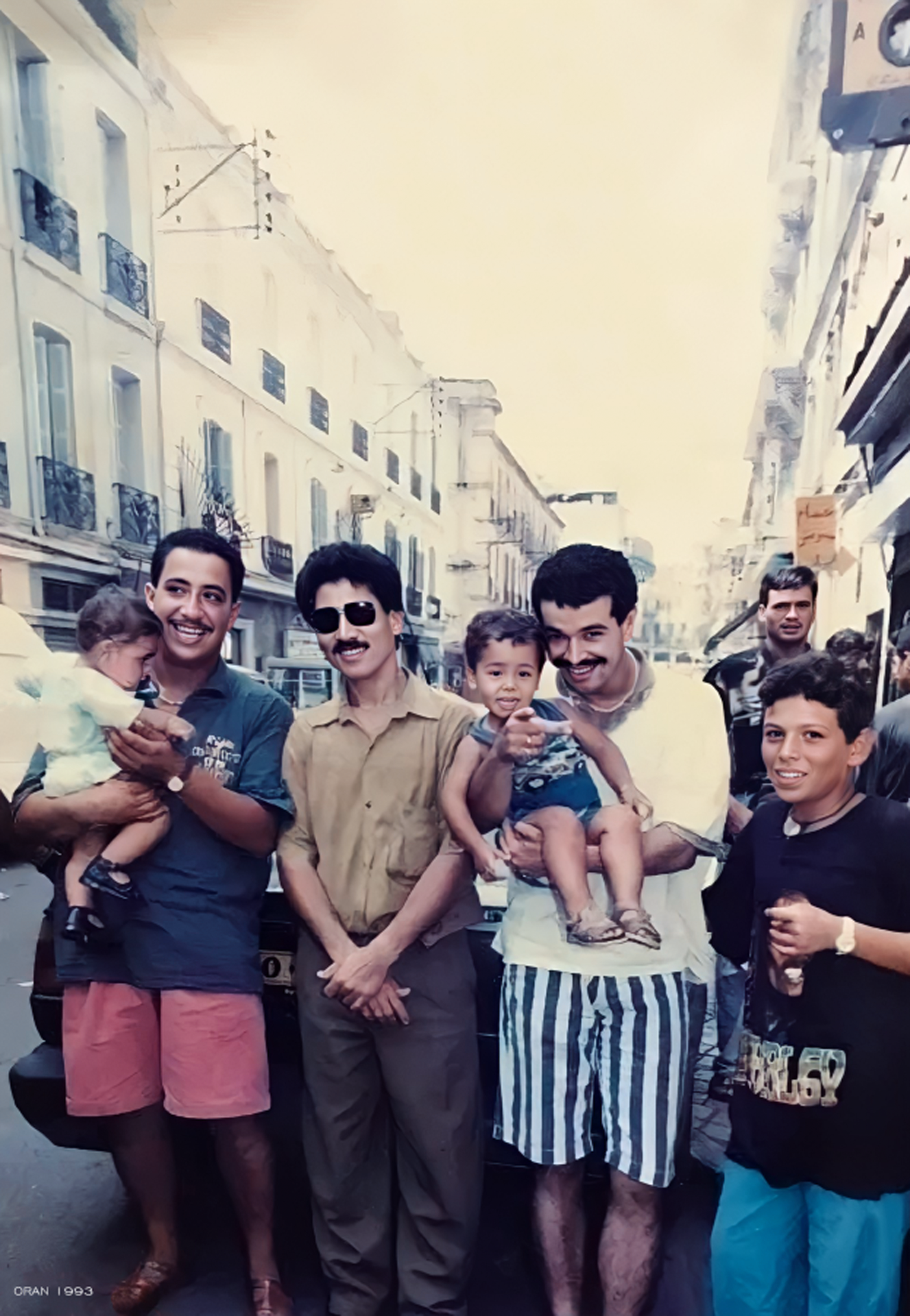
Cheb Hasni (far left) and Cheb Nasro in Oran, 1993

== Death ==
Hasni's fame and controversial songs led to him receiving death threats from Islamic fundamentalist extremists. His primary residence remained in Oran, even though his family lived in the safer environment of France. On September 29, 1994, he was murdered, outside his parents' home in the Gambetta district of Oran.

His killer's identity remains unknown but the circumstances of his death mirrored those of other individuals targeted by a militant Islamist Group, the GIA. A few days before his death, the Kabyle Berber singer Lounès Matoub was abducted, released and later assassinated in June 1998 by the GIA. The following year, on 15 February 1995, Raï producer Rachid Baba-Ahmed was assassinated in Oran.

== Legacy ==
Cheb Hasni's legacy is defined by his pivotal role in reshaping Raï music, a genre deeply rooted in Algerian culture. His artistic expression challenged societal norms and taboo topics, offering a voice to a frustrated youth and addressing social and political issues. His global influence extended Raï music to international audiences, transcending cultural boundaries.

Hasni became one of the most prolific artists on the Raï scene, producing over 100 recordings and selling 400,000 cassettes during his career. His distinctive "Raï love" style soon inspired imitators, notably Cheb Nasro, who launched his career in 1988 with the hit "Pour te faire plaisir".

He continues to be referred to as an iconic figure in the Raï genre, inspiring new generations of Algerian and Maghrebi artists.

He was posthumously awarded the National Order of Merit in 2017.

== Discography ==
- 1986 : Barraka (feat Zehwania)
- 1987 : Ila Ajbek Ezzine
- 1987 : Issèlou aalik è oomri
- 1987 : S'hab elbaroud
- 1987 : Hè bouya, llila mè tefrèchi
- 1988 : Nbellaa bèbi
- 1988 : Ma dannitch netfèrkou
- 1988 : Ssadda nass ellil
- 1988 : Aadyèni bezzèf (Feat Noria)
- 1988 : C'est fini aalik yè mehhenti
- 1988 : Moul el cabaret (Feat Abd Elhakk)
- 1988 : Netrajja f elhèbib
- 1989 : Sid elkadi
- 1989 : Bayda mon amour v1
- 1989 : Moulèt essag ddrif
- 1989 : Enroh maak laaziza
- 1989 : Chchira lli nebriha dima ybènli khyèl'ha
- 1990 : Adieu l'amour
- 1990 : "Tèlbouni hetta f echchira"
- 1990 : Saadek tzouwwejti
- 1990 : Aalèch rani maadeb
- 1990 : Chkoune irabbili weldi
- 1990 : Èna barkèni, ènas kilouni
- 1990 :Love me say
- 1990 : Rah Ben Bella l essaddam (Single)
- 1991 : J'ai mal au cœur
- 1991 : Lmossiba kharja m e lycée
- 1991 : Chlèrmek deggouni (Feat Zohra)
- 1991 : Elli zahreh mè yendamchi (Single)
- 1991 : Tout l' monde est là
- 1991 : Wellah mè kount dèyrek passager
- 1991 : Mon Premier Amour
- 1991 : Dis moi ha zzarga
- 1991 : Ssaraha raha
- 1991 : Hdartou fiya ou goultou mèt (3 titres de hasni et 3 titres de nasro)
- 1991 : Elli dlamni wellah mani msèmheh
- 1991 : Charaatni
- 1991 : Nediha meryoula
- 1991 : C'est pas la peine
- 1991 : Rabta lhenna
- 1992 : Ghir dommage
- 1992 : Tlabti lfrèk
- 1992 : Oran la france
- 1992 : Ghir mè tebkich
- 1992 : Aakkar
- 1992 : C'est fini
- 1992 : Tal ryèbek yè rzèli
- 1992 : Choufi oomri cha sra
- 1993 : Rani khellithè lek èmèna
- 1993 : Mè nnejemch eniich d eliicha
- 1993 : C est la logique yè bent ennès
- 1993 : Hebbitek mè s'elt ennès
- 1993 : Dèymen enwassik
- 1993 : Ki nchouf'ha yerkebni lhbèl
- 1993 : Guaa ennsa
- 1993 : Hekmet aalia rrab elaali (feat Zèhia)
- 1993 : Mani mani
- 1993 : Tebki wella mè tebkich
- 1993 : Enfin lkit elli tefhemni
- 1993 : Brit èna nchoufek
- 1993 : Rani Mourak
- 1993 : Nti sbèb rbinti
- 1994 : Guaa errjèl elli kèyen
- 1994 : Aeadouya megh'yar
- 1994 : Ddèteh emmigré
- 1994 : Khawwefni rjouaak
- 1994 : Meddit aahdi, ça y'est c'est fini
- 1994 : Saàdini (Feat Sorya Kinane, & Bouzid Abdelghani)
- 1994 : Ma bkatch elhedda
- 1994 : Aalèch yè aayniyya
- 1994 : Rabbi ltof biya
- 1994 : Iridoni bnèt ennès (Single)
- 1994 : Aaayit ensaleh, aayit neddareb
- 1994 : Srat biyya kassa
- 1994 : Rani nèdem aalè liyyèm
- 1994 : Rani marra hna ou marra lhih
