= Cheb Mami =

Algerian singer (born 1966)

Cheb Mami شاب مامي
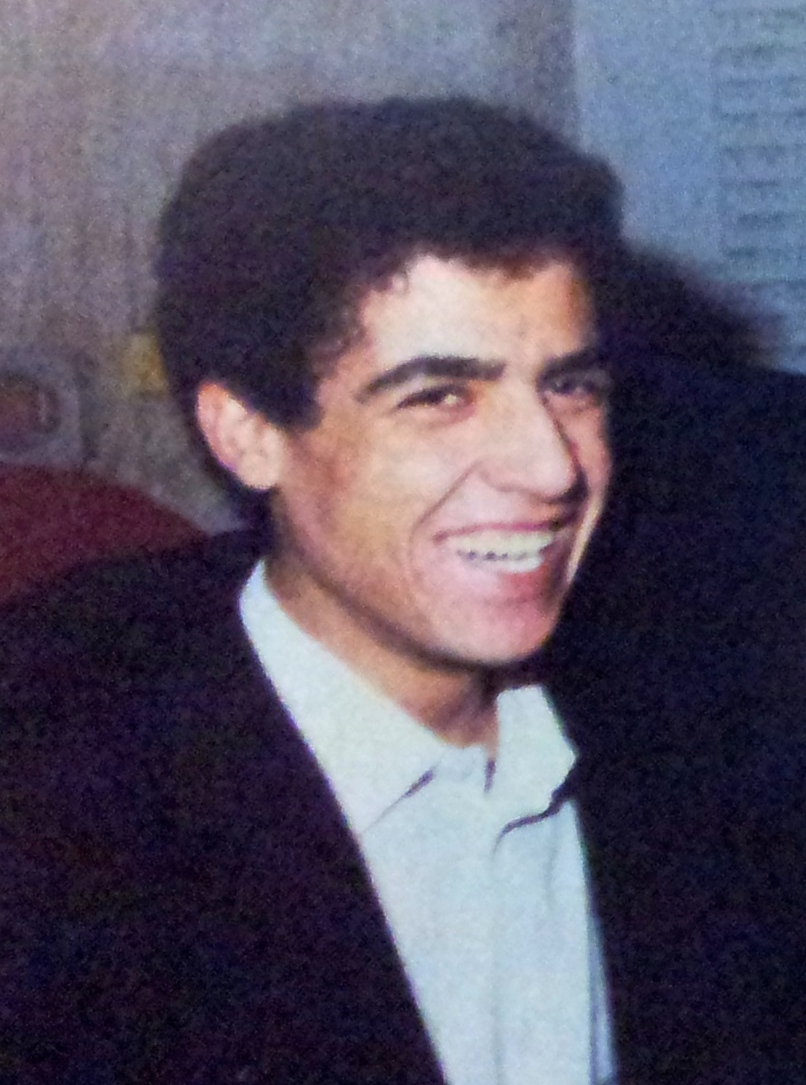
- Cheb Mami in 1986

Background information
- Born: Mohamed Khelifati (محمد خليفاتي); 11 July 1966 (age 60); Saïda, Algeria
- Genre: Raï
- Occupation: Singer-songwriter
- Instrument: Vocals
- Years active: 1982–present
- Labels: Virgin; A&M; Because Music; Rotana

Mohamed Khelifati (Arabic: محمد خليفاتي, romanized: Muḥammad Khalīfātī; born 11 July 1966), better known by his stage name Cheb Mami (شاب مامي, Shābb Māmī), is an Algerian raï musician and singer-songwriter. He sings and speaks in Algerian Arabic and sometimes in Eastern Arabic dialects or in French. Internationally, he is known for contributing vocals to the 1999 Sting single "Desert Rose".

== Early life ==
Cheb Mami was born in Graba-el-Wed, a populous quarter of Saïda, a city located 170 km south of Oran, on the high mesas of northwestern Algeria.

== Career ==
=== Early years and music styles adopted ===
Cheb Mami (cheb is an honorific for raï musicians) came to prominence in 1982, when, aged 16, he finished as runner-up in the televised Algerian talent show Alhane wa chabab (melodies and youth). He followed this by launching a career as a raï singer, performing at weddings and releasing cassettes after he drew the attention of music producers. In 1985, he moved to Paris, France, where he performed at raï festivals and met Michel Levy, who became his manager.

In 1987, he received his call-up for military service in Algeria just as he had potential concerts lined up, including a trip to Japan. He chose to serve rather than stay abroad and be unable to see his family. During his two years of service, he worked as an entertainer on army bases.

In May 1989, he returned to Paris and subsequently toured the United States, Germany, England, Scandinavia, the Netherlands, Switzerland, and Spain.

Cheb Mami's music is a blend of Mediterranean and Western influences, including flamenco, Greek and Turkish music, as well as Latin music, and his voice is tinged with Andalusian accents.

=== International recognition ===
When Sting's album Brand New Day was released in 1999, the pair's duet, "Desert Rose", appeared on singles charts around the world and led to television appearances on Saturday Night Live, the Today Show, Jay Leno, David Letterman, the Grammy Awards telecast, and even a live performance at the Super Bowl.

== Controversy ==
=== Arrest, imprisonment, and release ===
Cheb Mami was under an international arrest warrant after being indicted in October 2006 for "voluntary violence, sequestration, and threats" against an ex-wife, and failing to answer a court summons on 14 May 2007. He was accused of attempting to force an abortion on his then-girlfriend, magazine photographer Isabelle Simon. During a trip to Algeria in the summer of 2005, Simon was locked in a house belonging to one of Cheb Mami's friends, where an abortive procedure was attempted on her. Afterwards in France, she realized the fetus was still alive, and she later gave birth to a daughter. Cheb Mami had accused his manager Michel Levy of organizing the abortion plan; Levy was later sentenced to four years for plotting and organizing the assault. Cheb Mami was arrested in France several days before his trial and taken into custody by officials at a Paris airport as he arrived in the country from Algeria on 22 June 2009.

In July 2009, a Paris court found him guilty of drugging and attempted forcible abortion, and sentenced him to five years in prison.

On 21 September 2010, his lawyers applied for conditional release, a request that was turned down on 12 October 2010. Upon a second appeal however, the French court agreed for his conditional release on 23 March 2011.

=== Plagiarism ===
In July 2015, Cheb Mami and his production company EMI were ordered to pay a 200,000-euro fine to Algerian songwriter Rabah Zerradine, who performs under the name Cheb Rabah, for plagiarizing at least in part lyrics from several of his songs. The court ruled that Zerradine should be recognized as the sole author of four songs ("Le raï c'est chic", "Ma vie deux fois", "Mandanite", "Gualbi Gualbi") and as the original co-author of "Desert Rose", which achieved worldwide success in the early 2000s.

== Selected discography ==
- Manetzouatchi (1985)
- Douni l'bladi (1986)
- Ouach Etsalini (1986)
- Le Prince du Raï (1989)
- Let Me Raï (1990)
- Lazrag Saâni (1991)
- Nahmek toujours ya taleb (1996)
- Meli Meli (1998)
- Dimari with Cheba Zahouania (2000)
- Dellali (2001)
- Du Sud au Nord (2003)
- Live au Grand Rex (2004)
- Layali (2006)
