= Messaoud Bellemou =

Algerian musician

- Born: 1947 (age 78–79); Aïn Témouchent, Algeria
- Genres: Raï
- Occupation: Musician
- Instruments: Trumpet, Saxophone

Messaoud Bellemou (Arabic: مسعود بلمو) is an Algerian musician and one of the most influential performers of modern raï music. He is considered by some people to be one of the fathers of the genre.

== Career ==
Messaoud began his career playing the trumpet but soon became known for adding foreign instruments like the saxophone, violin, and accordion to the genre. He worked during the 1970s with different raï singers of his generation like Boutaïaba Sghir, Boussouar El Maghnaoui, and Bouteldja Belkacem.

In the 1980s, the term pop-raï was used to describe the new generation of chebs and chabas (from the Arabic for "young") introducing new instruments, and together with Belkacem Bouteldja released one of the first records of the new genre.
