= Cheb Sahraoui =

Algerian raï musician

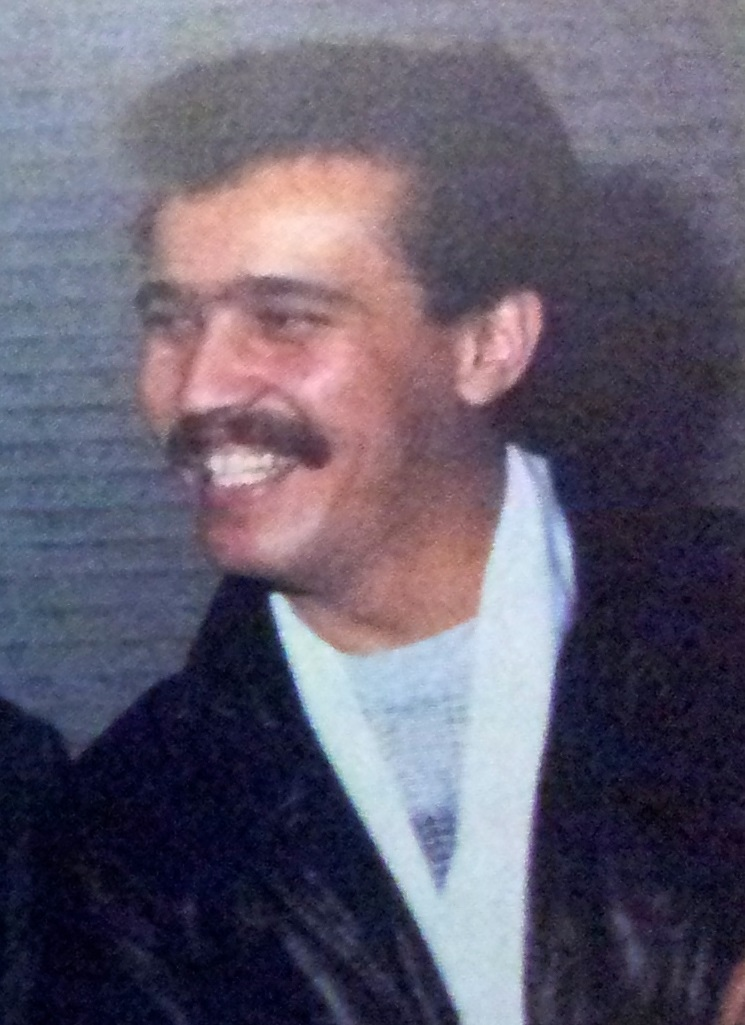
- Born: 1 April 1961 (age 65); Tlemcen
- Citizenship: Algeria
- Occupations: Singer,Pianist,Actor

Cheb Sahraoui (born Mohamed Sahraoui, Oran, Algeria, 1 April 1961) is an Algerian raï musician, the first raï singer to tour North America and the first to incorporate electronic synthesizers into his arrangements.

== Early life ==
As a pianist, he studied music at the conservatory of music in Oran, and launched his musical career by singing raï classics and Beatles tunes in the city's nightclubs. He released his first hit, "Ana Mahlali Noum", in 1978.

== Career ==
In 1983, he married singer Fadela Zalmat, known as Chaba Fadela, and the pair began recording as a duo. Their first record together, "N'sel Fik", became an international hit, and was followed by further record successes and tours, including tours of the US in 1990 and 1993. While in New York they recorded the album Walli with producer and multi-instrumentalist Bill Laswell. They relocated from Algeria to France in 1994.

In the late 1997, Sahraoui and Fadela separated. Sahraoui's debut solo album, Un Homme Libre (A Free Man), was released in 2000.

== Further information and main sources ==
- AMG entry
- Further information
