= Works of Rachid Taha =

== Discography ==
=== Albums ===
as part of Carte de Séjour

Year	Album	Peak positions
Year	Album	FRA
1983	Carte de Séjour	–
1984	Rhorhomanie	–
1986	2½ (Deux Et Demi)	–
1987	Ramsa (Cinq)	–

Solo Studio Albums

Year	Album	Peak positions	
Year	Album	FRA	BEL (Wa)
1991	Barbès: Record label: Universal / Barclay	–	–
1993	Rachid Taha: Record label: Universal / Barclay	–	–
1995/ 1996	Olé, Olé: Record label: Mango (1995) – Universal / Barclay (1996)	–	–
1998	Diwân: Record label: Wrasse	52	–
2000	Made in Medina: Record label: Universal / Barclay	38	–
2004	Tékitoi: Record label: Wrasse / Universal	63	84
2006	Diwan 2: Record label: Wrasse / Barclay	43	–
2009	Bonjour: Record label: Knitting Factory	126	–
2013	Zoom: Record label: Wrasse / Naïve	96	145
2019	Je suis Africain (posthumous release): Record label: Naïve	−	−

Compilation Albums

Year	Album	Peak positions	
Year	Album	FRA	BEL (Wa)
1997	Carte Blanche: Record label: Universal/Barclay	32	–
2007	The Definitive Collection (also known as Rock el Casbah: The Best of Rachid Taha): Record label: Wrasse	–	–
2011	Voilà Voilà le Best of: Record label: Universal/Barclay	–	–
2020	Rock N Raï: Record label: Shock / Barclay	–	–

Other Albums

Year	Album	Peak positions	
Year	Album	FRA	BEL (Wa)
1998	1,2,3 Soleils (live – Credited to: Taha / Khaled / Faudel): Record label: Universal / Polygram	4	14
2001	Rachid Taha Live (Medina Tour) (live): Record label: Universal / Barclay	–	–
2013	Cheba Louisa (Soundtrack from Françoise Charpiat's Motion Picture): Record label: Naïve	–	–

=== Singles ===
as part of Carte de Séjour

Year	Single	Peak positions	Album
Year	Single	FRA	Album
1982	"Halouf Nar"	–	–
1984	"Rhorhomanie"	–	Rhorhomanie
1984	"Bleu De Marseille"	–	Rhorhomanie
1986	"Douce France"	42	2½ (Deux Et Demi)
1986	"Ramsa"	–	2½ (Deux Et Demi)
1988	"Rhadine"	–	2½ (Deux Et Demi)

Solo

Year	Single	Peak positions		Album
Year	Single	FRA	BEL (Wa)	Album
1990	"Barbès"	–	–	Barbès
1990	"Confiance"	–	–	Barbès
1993	"Voilà, Voilà"	–	–	Rachid Taha
1993	"Indie"	–	–	Rachid Taha
1995	"Kelma"	–	–	Olé, Olé
1995	"Non Non Non"	–	–	Olé, Olé
1997	"Ya Rayah"	11	–	Diwân
1998	"Ida"	8	–	Diwân
1998	"Ach Adani"	–	–	Diwân
1998	"La bombe atomique"	–	–	–
1998	"Abdel Kader" (Live à Bercy) (Taha / Khaled / Faudel)	6	36	1,2,3 Soleils
1999	"Comme d'habitude" (Taha / Khaled / Faudel)	40	40	1,2,3 Soleils
2001	"Barra, Barra"	–	–	Made in Medina
2001	"Made in Medina"	–	–	Made in Medina
2001	"Tékitoi" (featuring Christian Olivier)	–	–	Tékitoi
2004	"Rock El Casbah"	–	–	Tékitoi
2006	"Écoute-Moi Camarade"	–	–	Diwân 2
2007	"Agatha"	–	–	Diwân 2
2009	"Bonjour" (featuring Gaëtan Roussel)	–	–	Bonjour
2013	"Wesh (N'amal)"	–	–	Zoom
2013	"Now or Never" (featuring Jeanne Added)	–	–	Zoom
2019	"Je suis africain"	–	–	Je suis africain

== Videography ==
as part of Carte De Séjour

- 1984: Bleu De Marseille
- 1987: Douce France

Solo

- 1991: Barbès
- 1993: Voilà, Voilà
- 1993: Indie
- 1995: Non Non Non
- 1995: Indie (1+1+1)
- 1997: Ya Rayah
- 1998: Ida
- 1999: 1,2,3 Soleils
- 2000: Hey Anta
- 2001: Rachid Taha En Concert Live Paris
- 2004: Tékitoi
- 2004: Rock El Casbah
- 2006: Écoute-Moi Camarade
- 2006: Agatha
- 2007: Ma Parabole D'Honneur
- 2009: Bonjour
- 2012: Voilà, Voilà
- 2013: Now or Never (feat. Jeanne Added)
- 2019: Je suis africain
