= Rencontres Trans Musicales =

Music festival in Rennes, Brittany, France

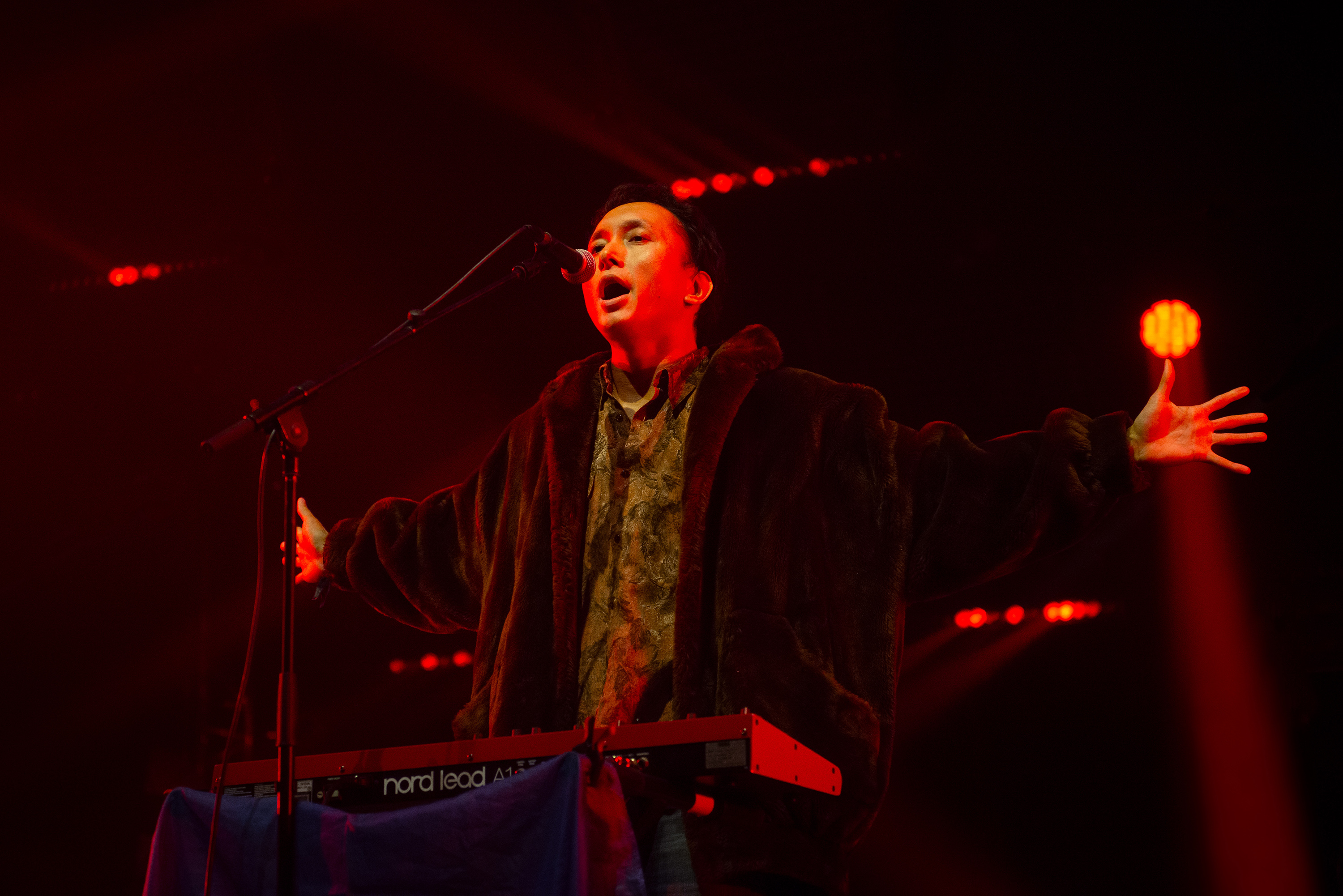
The band Heavenphetamine at Trans Musicales 2023

Les Rencontres Trans Musicales (generally referred to as Les Transmusicales de Rennes) is an annual music festival in Rennes, Brittany, France. It lasts for 3 or 4 days in December.

The festival in 2013 featured over 80 groups and artists from over 26 nationalities, and attracted over 62,000 people.

== History ==
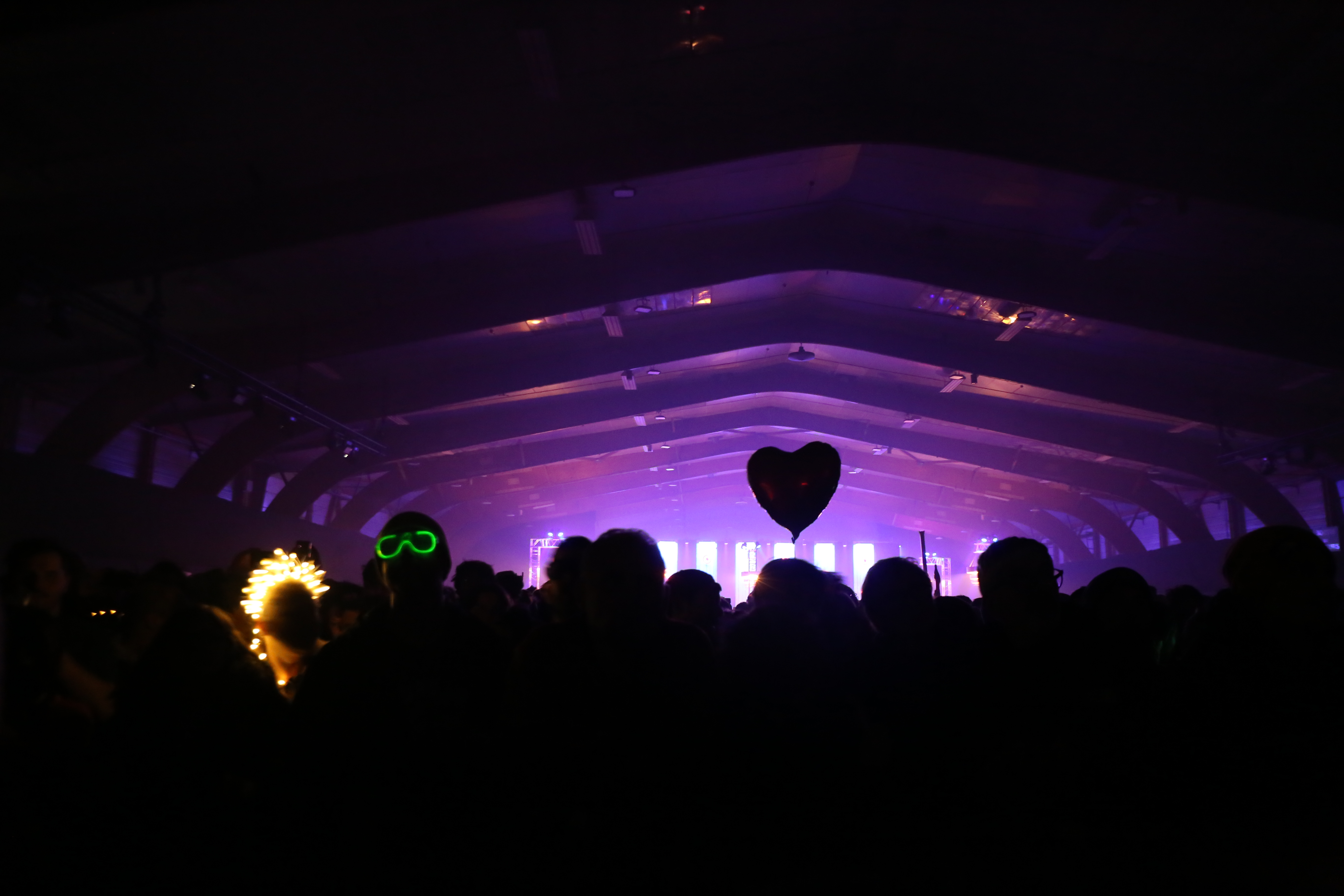
Public of Trans Musicales 2024 in the Parc Expo

Les Rencontres Trans Musicales, often called Les Trans, was created in 1979 by Béatrice Macé, Jean-Louis Brossard, Hervé Bordier (until 1996), Jean-René Courtès (until 1989), and other music students. The association was initially in debt, which led to programming a benefit concert. The first concert took place in la salle de la Cité in June. Twelve bands performed on two nights to an audience of approximately 1800 people. The second concert was in December 2013. Jean-Louis Brossard is the artistic director and Sandrine Poutrel is the production manager. Jean-Louis Brossard and Béatrice Macé together lead Les Rencontres Trans Musicales. From the first concerts, before the word 'festival' had been attached to the event, the artistic bias of the line up was toward originality and new artistic forms. The artists who participated in the festival would often rise to the top of the music charts within a few months following their performance. Björk, Ben Harper and Lenny Kravitz all performed for the first time in public in the festival. The festival has featured Étienne Daho, Arno, Stephan Eicher, Les Négresses Vertes, Nirvana, Bérurier Noir, Denez Prigent, Daft Punk, Amadou & Mariam, Birdy Nam Nam, Justice, Fugees, Stromae and London Grammar.

In 2004, the festival moved to the Parc Expo, close to Rennes Bretagne Airport. Some concerts are still organized in the town of Rennes. In 2004, the festival moved to the Parc Expo.

On 8 December 2010, l'Association des Trans Musicales launched a website that recounts the history of the festival.

== Line-up ==
Breakout artists:

- 1979: Marquis de Sade
- 1980: Étienne Daho, L'Orchestre Rouge
- 1981: Carte de Séjour, KaS Product, Les Dogs
- 1982: Minimal Compact, Blurt, Marc Minelli
- 1983: Cabaret Voltaire, Litfiba, TC Matic, La Fundación
- 1984: The Full, Stephan Eicher, Chevalier Brothers
- 1985: The Woodentops, Sigue Sigue Sputnik
- 1986: Noir Désir, Mint Juleps, Bérurier Noir
- 1987: Fishbone, Laibach, Yargo
- 1988: Mano Negra, Les Négresses Vertes, The Sugarcubes
- 1989: Lenny Kravitz, Einstürzende Neubauten, House of Love, 24-7 Spyz
- 1990: IAM, Stereo MCs, The La's, FFF
- 1991: Zebda, Keziah Jones, MC Solaar, Nirvana
- 1992: Denez Prigent, Sonic Youth, Underground Resistance, Suicide
- 1993: Björk, Ben Harper, Sinclair, Jamiroquai, Carl Cox
- 1994: Portishead, Massive Attack, Beck, The Prodigy, the Offspring
- 1995: DJ Shadow, Garbage, Chemical Brothers, Laurent Garnier
- 1996: Daft Punk, Nada Surf, Carlinhos Brown, Rinôçérôse
- 1997: Cypress Hill, Faudel, Yann Tiersen, Dyonisos, Tortoise
- 1998: Fat Boy Slim, Basement Jaxx, Freestylers, DJ Krush
- 1999: Macy Gray, Saïan Supa Crew, Coldcut, Groove Armada, Tony Allen
- 2000: Bumcello, De La Soul, Goldfrapp, Saul Williams, Amon Tobin
- 2001: Gotan Project, Röyksopp, Zéro7, Carl Hancock Rux, Overhead, Bauchklang
- 2002: Ginger Ale, Radio 4, Stupeflip, 2 Many DJs, An Pierlé
- 2003: Cody Chesnutt, !!!, Ralph Myerz & The Jack Herren Band
- 2004: Beastie Boys, Dizzee Rascal, Primal Scream, Ebony Bones
- 2005: The Fugees, The Undertones, Coldcut, Brian Jonestown Massacre, Philippe Katerine, Clap Your Hands Say Yeah
- 2006: Cassius, Klaxons, Kaiser Chiefs, Razorlight, The Horrors
- 2007: Simian Mobile Disco, Boys Noize, Étienne de Crécy, Yuksek,
- 2008: Minitel Rose, Birdy Nam Nam, The Shoes, Ebony Bones, The Penelopes, Diplo, Crookers
- 2009: The Japanese Popstars, FM Belfast, Fever Ray, The Very Best, Rodriguez, New Politics, Major Lazer
- 2010: Stromae, M.I.A., Janelle Monáe, A-Trak
- 2013: London Grammar, Jungle, Benjamin Clementine
- 2014: Jeanne Added, Shamir
- 2025: Angine de Poitrine

== The International Trans project ==
The international work has been going on since the end of the 1980s. Since the 2001 edition, the International Trans project has extended their work overseas, in partnership with Cultures France, a governmental operator on all international actions. The project was conceived as a way to extend the collaboration with the artists beyond the time span of a single edition. The line-up included bands that have performed or are about to perform the Trans in Rennes; they are joined by local artists.

=== Previous actions ===
==== Expo 2002 ====
The Trans Musicales team programmed two evenings at the Cargo, in Neuchâtel, for the Expo.

==== Trans/Ubu/Bato Fou ====
In March 2003 two evenings and two residencies opposing Dj Morpheus vs. El Diabolo (Réunion) and Dj Buddha vs. Tamm Ha Tamm (Réunion).

==== Norway 2005 ====
During the festival, By-Larm, one evening in honour of Rennes and one improvised concert at the top of a glacier.

==== Beijing ====
18 and 19 June 2005 at Chaoyang Park. A huge stage, 16 artists in front of 16 000 spectators for the first open air festival in the Chinese capital.

==== Russia ====
In 2010, concerts took place in Moscow and Saint Petersburg. Hip-Hop, jazz and electronic music were the main events.

== Trans on Tour ==
Co-produced by the association Trans Musicales, Trans on Tour tours participating bands to perform, including a performance at Trans Musicales for each participating band. It interviews at the beginning and the end of the tour, working time on the stage of the Ubu (local stage in Rennes), a regular follow-up by a specialised team, a promotional video and a dedicated stand at the festival's Village.
