= Rock N Raï =

Compilation album by Rachid Taha
- Released: 2008 & 2010
- Genre: Raï, rock, world
- Label: Shock Records/Barclay Records

Rachid Taha chronology
The Definitive Collection (2007)	Rock N Raï (2008)	Bonjour (2009)

Rock N Raï is a compilation album of songs by raï singer Rachid Taha and was first released in 2008 by Shock Records under licence from Barclay Records.

"Rock N Raï" contains a different selection of tracks to that included in The Definitive Collection, which was released by Wrasse in 2007.

It was followed by a second compilation "Rock N Raï 2" (2010).

Video clips have been made for "Barbés" (1991), "Ya Rayah" (1997), "Écoute Moi Camarade" (2006) & "Voilà, Voilà" (2012).

== "Rock N Raï" (2008) track listing ==
1. "Ala Jalkoum" featuring Femi Kuti
2. "Barbés"
3. "Barra Barra"
4. "Desolé"
5. "Dinaha"
6. "Écoute Moi Camarade"
7. "Foqt Foqt"
8. "Kelma"
9. "Malheureux Toujours"
10. "Malika"
11. "Medina" (Album Version)
12. "Non Non Non" (Multinational Version)
13. "Olé, Olé"
14. " Rock El Casbah"
15. "Valencia" featuring Kirsty Hawkshaw
16. "Voilà, Voilà"
17. "Malika"
18. "Ya Rayah"

== "Rock N Raï 2" (2010) track listing ==
1. "Barra Barra"
2. "Bonjour" featuring Gaëtan Roussel
3. "Voilà, Voilà"
4. "Qalantiqa"
5. "Meftuh'"
6. "Ya Rayah"
7. "Ala Jalkoum" featuring Femi Kuti
8. "Kelma"
9. "Nokta"
10. "Jungle Fiction"
11. "Lli Fat Mat!"
12. "This Is An Arabian Song" featuring Bruno Maman
13. "Ach Adani"
14. "Rock El Casbah"
15. "Aiya Aiya"
16. "Boire"
17. "En Retard"
18. "Écoute Moi Camarade"
