= Rachid Taha (album) =

1993 solo album by Rachid Taha

Studio album by Rachid Taha
- Released: 1993
- Genre: Raï, Dance, Electronica
- Label: Barclay
- Producer: Steve Hillage & Justin Robertson

Rachid Taha chronology
Barbès (1991)	Rachid Taha (1993)	Olé, Olé (1995)

Rachid Taha is the second solo album by Rachid Taha after he left the group Carte de Séjour. It was produced by Steve Hillage and Justin Robertson; and was first released in 1993.

The album contains Taha’s song "Voilà Voilà", which was released as a dance-oriented single that was a hit with English DJs; and his version of Ya Rayah, the classic chaâbi song composed by Dahmane El Harrachi (real name Abderrahmane Amrani). Taha returns to these songs in later albums.

A video clip was later made for "Ya Rayah" Taha and Bruno Maman co-wrote "Indie (1+1+1)", which was released as a single in 1995 and for which a video clip was also made.

== Track listing ==
1. Yamess
2. Malika
3. Voilà Voilà
4. Hitiste
5. D'Abord D'Abord
6. Indie (Instrumental)
7. Hasard
8. Dinaha
9. Ya Rayah
10. Woulla
11. Menek
12. Laisse Moi
13. Yamess (Instrumental)
14. Voilà Voilà (Justin Robertson Vocal Edit)
15. Indie (Vocal Version/ 1+1+1...)

== Personnel ==
- Rachid Taha - Programming, Vocals
- Steve Hillage - Bass, Effects, Guitar, Keyboards, Mixing, Producer, Programming
- Nabil Khalidi - Banjo, Bendire, Oud, Percussion, Programming
- Pete Davies - Keyboards, Piano
- Hossam Ramzy - Percussion
- Jah Wobble - Bass
- Geoff Richardson - Cello, Viola, Violin
- Justin Robertson - Producer, Remixing
- Aniff Cousins - Vocals
- Blair Booth - Vocals
- Bruno Maman - Vocals
- Miquette Giraudy - Background vocals
- Pinise Saul - Background vocals
- Pepsi DeMacque - Background vocals
- Rachel Des Bois - Background vocals
- Satya Sai - Background vocals
- Sonti Mndebele - Background vocals
