= The Definitive Collection (Rachid Taha album) =

2007 compilation album by Rachid Taha

Compilation album by Rachid Taha
- Released: May 2007
- Genre: Raï, rock, world
- Label: Wrasse (Wrass #182)
- Producer: Steve Hillage

Rachid Taha chronology
Diwan 2 (2006)	The Definitive Collection (2007)	Rock N Raï (2008)

Professional ratings
Review scores
Source	Rating
Allmusic	4/5 stars

The Definitive Collection is a compilation album by raï singer Rachid Taha. It was released by Wrasse Records in 2007. The album's initial release was limited to 2000 copies, which were accompanied by a DVD that documented Taha's return to Algeria. The album was released in the U.S. in 2008 under the title Rock el Casbah: The Best of Rachid Taha.

Video clips have been made for "Barbès" (1991), "Ya Rayah" (1997), "Ida" (1998), "Hey Anta" (2000), & "Voilà, Voilà" (2012).

== Track listing ==
1. "Ya Rayah"
2. "Rock El Casbah"
3. "Nokta"
4. "Voilà, Voilà"
5. "Habina"
6. "Kelma"
7. "Bent Sahra"
8. "Douce France"
9. "Indie"
10. "Jungle Fiction"
11. "Ida"
12. "Hey Anta"
13. "Barbès"
14. "Barra Barra"
15. "Menfi"

== Release history ==
Region	Date	Label	Format(s)	Catalog
Europe	21 May 2007	Wrasse Records	Digital download	WRASS182
Europe	May 2007	Wrasse Records	CD, CD/DVD	WRASS182
U.S.	2 September 2008	Wrasse Records (US)	Digital download	WRASS215
U.S.	2 September 2008	Wrasse Records (US)	CD	WRASS215
