= Carry Fire =

Studio album by Robert Plant
- Released: 13 October 2017
- Recorded: The Attic Studio, Bristol; The Bee Barn, Bala; Billy Fuller's Home Studio, Bristol; Black Earth Studios, Bath; Real World Studios, Box, Wiltshire, England; Rockfield Studios, Monmouth, Monmouthshire, Wales
- Genres: Americana; folk rock
- Length: 49:05
- Label: Nonesuch/Warner Bros.
- Producer: Robert Plant

Robert Plant chronology
Lullaby and the Ceaseless Roar (2014)	Carry Fire (2017)	Digging Deep: Subterranea (2020)

Singles from Carry Fire
- 1. "The May Queen" Released: 18 August 2017; 2. "Bones of Saints" Released: 1 September 2017; 3. "Bluebirds Over the Mountain" Released: 26 September 2017

Carry Fire is the eleventh solo studio album by the English rock singer, songwriter and musician Robert Plant, released on 13 October 2017 on Nonesuch/Warner Bros. Records. It was also Plant's second studio album with his backing band the Sensational Space Shifters, although the band is not credited on the front cover.

== Reception ==
Professional ratings
Aggregate scores
Source	Rating
Metacritic	84/100
Review scores
Source	Rating
AllMusic	4.5/5 stars
American Songwriter	4.5/5 stars
Clash	8/10
Classic Rock	4/5 stars
Exclaim!	7/10
The Independent	4/5 stars
The Observer	4/5 stars
Paste	7.8/10
PopMatters	8/10 stars
Record Collector	4/5 stars
Slant Magazine	4.5/5 stars
Under the Radar	8/10 stars

Carry Fire received positive reviews from critics. On Metacritic, the album holds a score of 84/100 based on 15 reviews, indicating "universal acclaim". The album was selected as the 37th best album of 2017 by Rolling Stone magazine. The album was honoured as the best selling UK Americana album at the 2018 UK Americana Awards.

== Track listing ==
No.	Title	Writer(s)	Length
1.	"The May Queen"	Robert Plant, Justin Adams, John Baggott, Billy Fuller, Liam Tyson	4:14
2.	"New World..."	Plant, Baggott, Fuller, Dave Smith, Tyson	3:29
3.	"Season's Song"	Plant, Adams, Baggott, Fuller, Tyson	4:19
4.	"Dance with You Tonight"	Plant, Adams, Baggott, Fuller, Smith, Tyson	4:48
5.	"Carving up the World Again... A Wall and Not a Fence"	Plant, Adams, Baggott, Fuller, Tyson	3:55
6.	"A Way with Words"	Plant, Adams, Baggott	5:18
7.	"Carry Fire"	Plant, Adams, Baggott, Fuller, Smith, Tyson	5:28
8.	"Bones of Saints"	Plant, Adams, Fuller, Smith, Tyson	3:47
9.	"Keep It Hid"	Plant, Adams, Baggott	4:07
10.	"Bluebirds over the Mountain" (featuring Chrissie Hynde)	Ersel Hickey	4:58
11.	"Heaven Sent"	Plant, Adams, Baggott, Fuller, Smith, Tyson	4:39
Total length:			49:05

== Personnel ==
Musicians

- Robert Plant – vocals, production
- The Sensational Space Shifters (as backing band):
  - Justin Adams – guitar, oud
  - Liam "Skin" Tyson – guitar
  - John Baggott – keyboards
  - Billy Fuller – bass guitar
  - Dave Smith – drums
- Seth Lakeman – viola, fiddle
- Redi Hasa – cello
- Chrissie Hynde – vocals

== Charts ==
=== Weekly charts ===
Chart (2017)	Peak position
Australian Albums (ARIA)	16
Austrian Albums (Ö3 Austria)	13
Belgian Albums (Ultratop Flanders)	17
Belgian Albums (Ultratop Wallonia)	12
Canadian Albums (Billboard)	12
Czech Albums (ČNS IFPI)	2
Dutch Albums (Album Top 100)	29
Finnish Albums (Suomen virallinen lista)	10
French Albums (SNEP)	33
German Albums (Offizielle Top 100)	10
Hungarian Albums (MAHASZ)	24
Irish Albums (IRMA)	7
Italian Albums (FIMI)	23
New Zealand Albums (RMNZ)	7
Norwegian Albums (VG-lista)	9
Polish Albums (ZPAV)	9
Scottish Albums (Official Charts)	3
Slovak Albums (ČNS IFPI)	15
Spanish Albums (PROMUSICAE)	28
Swedish Albums (Sverigetopplistan)	12
Swiss Albums (Schweizer Hitparade)	7
UK Albums (Official Charts)	3
US Billboard 200	14
US Top Rock Albums (Billboard)	4

=== Year-end charts ===
Chart (2017)	Position
Belgian Albums (Ultratop Wallonia)	175
