= Diwan 2 =

2006 studio album by Rachid Taha

Diwân 2

Studio album by Rachid Taha
- Released: 16 October 2006; 23 October 2006 (UK)
- Genre: Raï
- Labels: Wrasse, Barclay, Universal
- Producer: Steve Hillage

Rachid Taha chronology
Tékitoi (2004)	Diwân 2 (2006)	The Definitive Collection (2007)

Singles from Diwân 2
- 1. "Écoute Moi Camarade" Released: 2006; 2. "Agatha" Released: 19 March 2007

Professional ratings
Review scores
Source	Rating
AllMusic	4/5 stars
The Daily Telegraph	(positive)
The Guardian	4/5 stars
Fly: Global Music Culture	(positive)
The Independent	4/5 stars
MSN Music (Consumer Guide)	A
Pitchfork	7.2/10

Diwân 2 is the seventh studio album by French–Algerian Raï singer Rachid Taha. It was released by Wrasse Records on 16 October 2006. The album is a follow-up to Diwân (1998) and primarily features cover versions of songs recorded by Blaoui Houari and Mohamed Mazouni.

The album features the Egyptian percussionist Hossam Ramzy and the Cairo String Ensemble.

A video clip was made for "Écoute Moi Camarade".

== Track listing ==
1. "Écoute Moi Camarade"
2. "Rani M'Hayer"
3. "Agatha"
4. "Kifache Rah"
5. "Josephine"
6. "Gana El Hawa"
7. "Aah Mon Amour"
8. "Mataouel Delil"
9. "Maydoum"
10. "Ghanny Li Shwaya"

== Personnel ==
- Rachid Taha: vocals, arrangements
- Steve Hillage: producer, programming, electric and acoustic guitar
- Morgan Marchand: programming, additional vocal production
- Hakim Hamadouche: mandolute, backing vocals
- Miquette Giraudy: backing vocals
- Guillaume Rossel: drums
- Idris Badarou: bass guitar
- Stephane Baudet: trumpet
- Rachid Belgacem: percussion
- Hossam Ramzy: percussion
- Hazem Shahin: oud
- Mohammed Fouda: ney
- Kemang Kanoute: kora
- Magid Sorour: qanun
- Kadi Bouguenaya: gasbar oranais
- Bruno Maman: electric guitar, additional vocal production
- Tariq Saeed M.E.: Oriental keyboard
- Osama El Khouly: backing vocals
- Doaa Fawzy: backing vocals
- Nashwa Essam: backing vocals
- Yolande Brzezinski: backing vocals
- Cairo String Ensemble: Yania El Moughi: violin, leader; Anwar Mansi: violin; Ebada Mansi: violin; Adel Eskander: violin, backing vocals; Yasser Taha: cello

== Charts ==
Chart (2006)	Peak position
French Albums Chart	43
