= Carte Blanche (Rachid Taha album) =

1997 compilation album by Rachid Taha

Compilation album by Rachid Taha
- Released: 1997
- Length: 1:07:31
- Label: Barclay
- Producer: Steve Hillage, Yves Aouizerate, Mark Frank, Michel Zacha, Nick Patrick, Jam'ba

Rachid Taha chronology
| Olé, Olé (1995) | Carte Blanche (1997) | Diwân (1998) |

Carte Blanche is a compilation album by Algerian raï artist Rachid Taha, consisting of songs he recorded with Mohammed Amini, Mokthar Amini and Jérôme Savy when they formed a band called Carte de Séjour, along with songs from his more recent solo albums. It was released in 1997 by Barclay, and produced by Steve Hillage.

Valencia features the singing of Kirsty Hawkshaw. A video clip was made for "Ya Rayah" Taha and Bruno Maman co-wrote "Indie (1+1+1)", for which a video clip was also made.

== Track listing ==
| # | Title | Songwriters | Length |
|---|---|---|---|
| 1 | "Ya Rayah" | Amrani Aberrahmane | 6:16 |
| 2 | "Douce France" | Léon Chauliac, Charles Trenet | 3:40 |
| 3 | "Bleu de Marseille" | Mohammed Amini, Mokhtar Amini, Jèôme Savy, Rachid Taha | 4:33 |
| 4 | "Rhorhomanie" | Amini, Amini, Savy, Taha | 4:21 |
| 5 | "Ramsa" | Amini, Amini, Savy, Taha | 3:55 |
| 6 | "Zoubida" | Amini, Amini, Alexandre Dif, Taha | 4:35 |
| 7 | "Barbès" | Taha | 4:25 |
| 8 | "Bled" | Taha | 4:29 |
| 9 | "Malika" | Taha | 3:57 |
| 10 | "Voilà, Voilà" | Taha | 5:17 |
| 11 | "Indie" (Vocal version/ 1+1+1...) | Taha, Bruno Maman | 4:20 |
| 12 | "Non Non Non" (Original version) | Taha | 4:09 |
| 13 | "Valencia" | Taha, Steve Hillage | 4:47 |
| 14 | "Jungle Fiction" | Taha, Hillage | 4:03 |
| 15 | "Kelma" | Taha | 4:51 |

== Charts ==
| Chart (1997) | Peak position |
|---|---|
| French Albums Chart | 32 |
