= Comme d'habitude =

French song adapted into "My Way"

- 7" vinyl single cover

Single by Claude François

from the album Comme d'habitude
- Language: French
- English title: As per usual
- B-side: "L'homme au traîneau" "La plus belle chose du monde"
- Released: November 1967
- Recorded: 17 September 1967
- Studio: Studio Gaîté (Paris, France)
- Length: 4:15
- Label: Disques Flèche
- Composers: Claude François; Jacques Revaux
- Lyricists: Claude François; Gilles Thibaut
- Producer: Claude François

Claude François singles chronology
"Mais quand le matin" (1967)	"Comme d'habitude" (1967)	"Pardon" (1968)

"Comme d'habitude" ([kɔm dabityd(ə)], French for "As per usual") is a French song about the setting in of routine in a relationship, precipitating a breakup. It was composed in 1967 by Jacques Revaux, with lyrics by Claude François and Gilles Thibaut.

In 1969, Paul Anka wrote English lyrics for the song and gave it the title "My Way", which became one of Frank Sinatra's signature songs.

== Original ==
In February 1967, Jacques Revaux, on holiday in the Hôtel Canada in Megève, realised that he was overdue to write four songs commissioned by producer Norbert Saada, and wrote them all in one morning. One titled "For Me" had English lyrics; it was refused by Michel Sardou, Mireille Mathieu, Hugues Aufray and François before Hervé Vilard released a version as a B-side. Revaux was dissatisfied and visited François at Dannemois on 27 August 1967 proposing to rework the song for him. François accepted but asked that an underlying theme of a couple in a strained relationship be included, in reference to his recent breakup with fellow French singer France Gall. Revaux agreed and with some rewriting from Gilles Thibaut the song became "Comme d'habitude" in its best-known version in French, which was released by François in 1968.

== Notable cover versions ==
Many artists sang "Comme d'habitude" in French after François' success (and international success through '"My Way"), notably:

- Florent Pagny covered the song in 1989 and released as a single in France. It charted at No. 6 in France's Singles Chart.
- Hungarian singer Jozsef Gregor recorded the song in 1996 with Hungarian language love-themed lyrics written by Andras Ruszanov. Two years later, Gregor sang this version in one of the most popular TV shows in Budapest; since then this version has been permanently on the playlists of numerous radio stations in Hungary.
- Algerian raï musicians Rachid Taha, Faudel, and Cheb Khaled concluded 1, 2, 3 Soleils, the largest raï performance ever, with a cover the song. The song is also available on the deluxe edition of the live concert album, which went on to attain 2× gold certification.

=== "My Way" ===
Paul Anka, after hearing the song while listening to French radio, bought the song's publication and adaptation rights but the original songwriters retained the music-composition half of their songwriter royalties. Anka wrote English lyrics specifically for Frank Sinatra, who then recorded a version of it in 1969 under the title "My Way". "My Way" has since been covered by many artists.

The lyrics of "My Way" are similar to those of "Comme d'habitude" in terms of structure and metre, but the meaning is completely different. The French song is about routine in a relationship that is falling out of love, while the English language version is set at the end of a lifetime, approaching death, and looking back without regret. François himself later recorded said adaptation on his 1977 English album Claude François en Anglais.

=== Others ===
- André Hazes in 1980 released a version with new Dutch lyrics, titled "Waarom" ('Why?').
- Kris Phillips in 1980's "夺标", in the album with the same name.
- Gipsy Kings on their eponymous 1987 album included a Spanish version; although the title "A Mi Manera" translates to "My Way", the love-themed lyrics are more reminiscent of the Claude François song.
- The screenplay for Superman IV called for a Russian cosmonaut to sing a Russian version of "My Way", but the music supervisor realised that commissioning original Russian lyrics for Revaux' tune would cost much less than acquiring translation rights to Anka's lyrics, and that non-Russophone audiences would not notice the difference.
- David Bowie said that in 1968 – the year before Paul Anka acquired the French song – his publisher asked him to write English lyrics for "Comme d'habitude" but that his version, titled "Even a Fool Learns to Love", was rejected. This work became the starting point for his 1971 song "Life on Mars". Chris O'Leary wrote that David Bowie felt "using Comme d'habitude (...) wasn't theft (...) more a statement of rightful ownership." The phrase "Inspired by Frankie" was written next to the song in the LP liner notes of Hunky Dory.
- Sex Pistols/ Sid Vicious, 1979, brought a deteriorating performance: Sex Pistols' album, The Great Rock 'n' Roll Swindle (1979) and Sid Vicious' album, Sid Sings
