= Rachid Taha Live =

2001 live album by Rachid Taha

Live album by Rachid Taha
- Released: 2001
- Recorded: Brussels, 11 March 2001
- Genre: Worldbeat, Raï
- Length: 78:28:43
- Label: Barclay, Universal
- Producer: Steve Hillage

Rachid Taha chronology
Made in Medina (2000)	Rachid Taha Live (2001)	Tékitoi (2004)

Professional ratings
Review scores
Source	Rating
Allmusic	link
Robert Christgau	A−

Rachid Taha Live is a live album from French-Algerian raï artist Rachid Taha, released in 2001 by Barclay. It was produced and arranged by Steve Hillage, and recorded during a concert at L'Ancienne Belgique in Brussels, March 11, 2001.

== Track listing ==
1. "Menfi" – 6:05
2. "Nokta" – 6:39
3. "Ida" – 6:23
4. "Ya Rayah" – 8:59
5. "Medina" – 6:46
6. "Bent Sahra" – 9:00
7. "Barra Barra" – 5:42
8. "Foqt Foqt" – 6:46
9. "Ala Jalkoum (with Femi Kuti)" – 5:06
10. "Voilà Voilà" – 7:47
11. "Garab" – 8:45

== Personnel ==
- Rachid Taha: Composer, Primary Artist
- Abdel Abrit: Drums
- Yves Aouizerate: Keyboards
- Francois Delfin: Guitar
- François Even: Bass
- Hakim Hamadouche: Lute
- Steve Hillage: Arranger, Composer, Guest Artist, Guitar, Mixing, Producer
- Ahmed Khelifi: Composer
- Femi Kuti: Guest Artist, Saxophone, Vocals
- Hassan Lachal: Darbouka
