= Lullaby and the Ceaseless Roar =

Lullaby and...The Ceaseless Roar

Studio album by Robert Plant
- Released: 8 September 2014
- Recorded: Helium Studios, Wiltshire; Real World Studios, nr Bath; Contino Rooms, London
- Genres: Experimental rock; worldbeat; folk rock; alternative rock
- Length: 50:00
- Label: Nonesuch/Warner Bros.
- Producer: Robert Plant

Robert Plant chronology
Sensational Space Shifters (Live in London July '12) (2012)	Lullaby and...The Ceaseless Roar (2014)	Carry Fire (2017)

Lullaby and the Ceaseless Roar (stylized as lullaby and…The Ceaseless Roar) is the tenth solo studio album by the English rock singer Robert Plant. It was released on 8 September 2014 on Nonesuch/Warner Bros. Records. It was also Plant's first studio album with his backing band the Sensational Space Shifters, although the band is not credited on the front cover.

== Critical reception ==
Professional ratings
Aggregate scores
Source	Rating
Metacritic	81/100
Review scores
Source	Rating
AllMusic	4.5/5 stars
American Songwriter	4.5/5 stars
The Guardian	4/5 stars
Mojo	4/5 stars
Paste	9.3/10
Pitchfork	7.0/10
PopMatters	6/10
Record Collector	4/5 stars
Rolling Stone	3/5 stars
Uncut	9/10

Lullaby and the Ceaseless Roar received acclaim by the majority of music critics. At Metacritic, which assigns a normalised rating out of 100 to reviews from a selection of critics, the album received an average score of 81, based on 23 reviews. The album was named one of the 50 best albums of 2014 by NPR Music.

== Track listing ==
No.	Title	Writer(s)	Length
1.	"Little Maggie"	Traditional, arranged by Robert Plant, Justin Adams, John Baggott, Billy Fuller, Dave Smith, Liam "Skin" Tyson	5:06
2.	"Rainbow"	Plant, Adams, Baggott, Fuller, Tyson	4:18
3.	"Pocketful of Golden"	Plant, Adams, Baggott, Juldeh Camara, Fuller, Smith, Tyson	4:12
4.	"Embrace Another Fall"	Plant, Adams, Baggott, Camara, Fuller, Smith, Tyson	5:52
5.	"Turn It Up"	Plant, Adams, Baggott, Fuller, Smith, Tyson	4:06
6.	"A Stolen Kiss"	Plant, Adams, Baggott, Fuller, Tyson	5:15
7.	"Somebody There"	Plant, Adams, Baggott, Fuller, Smith, Tyson	4:32
8.	"Poor Howard" (^{‡})	Plant, Adams, Baggott, Camara, Fuller, Smith, Tyson	4:13
9.	"House of Love"	Plant, Adams, Baggott, Fuller, Smith, Tyson	5:07
10.	"Up on the Hollow Hill (Understanding Arthur)"	Plant, Adams, Baggott, Fuller, Tyson	4:35
11.	"Arbaden (Maggie's Babby)"	Plant, Adams, Baggott, Camara, Fuller, Smith, Tyson	2:44

^‡ – derived from the Lead Belly song "Po' Howard" (Huddie Ledbetter, John A. Lomax, Alan Lomax); also incorporates lyrics and melody from "Wah Wah", from the album No Quarter: Jimmy Page and Robert Plant Unledded.

== Personnel ==
Musicians

- Robert Plant – vocals, production
- The Sensational Space Shifters (as backing band):
  - Justin Adams – bendirs, djembe, guitars, tehardant, background vocals
  - Liam "Skin" Tyson – banjo, guitar, background vocals.
  - John Baggott – keyboards, loops, moog bass, piano, tabla, background vocals
  - Juldeh Camara – kologo, ritti, Fulani vocals
  - Billy Fuller – bass, drum programming, omnichord, upright bass
  - Dave Smith – drum set
- Julie Murphy – vocals on "Embrace Another Fall"
- Nicola Powell – background vocals on "Poor Howard"

Production

- Tim Oliver – recording, mixing
- Tim Holmes – recording
- Tchad Blake – mixing
- Bob Ludwig – mastering
- Brett Kilroe and Geoffrey Hanson – art direction

== Charts ==
=== Weekly charts ===
Chart (2014)	Peak position
Australian Albums (ARIA)	22
Austrian Albums (Ö3 Austria)	11
Belgian Albums (Ultratop Flanders)	15
Belgian Albums (Ultratop Wallonia)	6
Canadian Albums (Billboard)	6
Danish Albums (Hitlisten)	3
Dutch Albums (Album Top 100)	15
Finnish Albums (Suomen virallinen lista)	4
German Albums (Offizielle Top 100)	10
Hungarian Albums (MAHASZ)	2
Italian Albums (FIMI)	10
New Zealand Albums (RMNZ)	7
Norwegian Albums (VG-lista)	2
Polish Albums (ZPAV)	4
Scottish Albums (Official Charts)	1
Spanish Albums (Promusicae)	30
Swedish Albums (Sverigetopplistan)	6
Swiss Albums (Schweizer Hitparade)	6
UK Albums (Official Charts)	2
US Billboard 200	10
US Digital Albums (Billboard)	15
US Top Rock Albums (Billboard)	4
US Indie Store Album Sales (Billboard)	3

=== Year-end charts ===
Chart (2014)	Position
Belgian Albums (Ultratop Wallonia)	124
UK Albums (OCC)	94
US Top Rock Albums (Billboard)	61
