= Juldeh Camara =

Gambian musician

Juldeh Camara (born 1966, Basse, Gambia) is a griot, as well as an internationally followed blues musician and recording artist who has appeared on 21 albums. He is known for his instrumental virtuosity and for his collaborations with European, African, and other artists. His instrument is an African one-string fiddle, known as Nyanyero in his native Fula language or Riti in the Wolof language.

He grew up in Casamance, Senegal, living with his blind father Serif. His father taught him to play. There is a family or local tradition that his father had his eyesight taken by Djinn in return for learning music from one, and that the sound of the Djinn in can also be found in Juldeh's music.It was not until age 5 that Juldeh Camara began watching his father play the nyanyeru, the ritti. It came a point the young Juldeh cried whenever his father refused to give the ritti to fiddle with it. As the father, Sheriff Camara continued his musical tours in Basse sometimes with reputable politicians like the former vice president of the Gambia Assan Musa Camara, by now Camara had started to fine-tune his fingers with the rhythm of the nyanyeru

In June 2014, after touring with the band since late 2012, Camara appeared as part of the Sensational Space Shifters with Robert Plant at the 2014 Glastonbury Extravaganza.

== Discography ==
Juldeh Camara has appeared on the following albums:

- Ancient Heart - Mandinka & Fula Music of the Gambia (1990)
- Tramp (1993)
- Klapp (1995)
- Hiptodisiac (1997)
- Dee Ellington (1997)
- New-York Paris Dakar (1997)
- Gis Gis (1998)
- Millenium Drum Salute (1998)
- Kairo Sounds of the Gambia, various artists (Arch Entertainment, 1999)
- Moto Moto, Batanai Marimba (2000)
- Mudzimu Mudzimu, Batanai Marimba (Sterns, 2002)
- Madirisa, Daykil Chosan Group (2003)
- ZubopGambia Live, ZubopGambia (2004)
- The Drummer, Boka Halat (Taps, 2004)
- Afro-Mandinka Soul, Seckou Keita Quartet (ARC Music, 2006)
- Soul Science, Justin Adams and Juldeh Camara (World Village Records, 2007)
- Kanaké, Ebraima Tata Dindin Jobarteh (2008)
- Tell No Lies, Justin Adams and Juldeh Camara (Real World Records, 2009)
- The Trance Sessions, Justin Adams and Juldeh Camara (Real World Records, 2010)
- In Trance - JuJu (band of Justin Adams and Juldeh Camara) (Real World Records, 2011)
- Traders, Julaba Kunda, Juldeh Camara, and Griselda Sanderson (Waulk Records, 2011)
- Lullaby and the Ceaseless Roar, Robert Plant and The Sensational Space Shifters (Nonesuch Records Inc., 2014 - 7559-79542-1)
