= Baïda (album) =

Studio album by Faudel
- Released: October 28, 1997
- Length: 57:42
- Label: Universal Music Division Mercury Records

Faudel chronology
Baïda (1997)	1,2,3 Soleils (1999)

Singles from Baïda
- 1. "Tellement N'brick" Released: 1997; 2. "Dis-moi" Released: 1998; 3. "Baïda" Released: 1999

Baïda (English : Blonde) is the debut album by French singer Faudel, released in 1997.

== Success ==
The album spent 42 weeks in the SNEP charts, selling over 350,000 copies. It was nominated for Best Traditional Album at the victoires de la musique 1998.

== Track listing ==
1. "Anti" (4:25)
2. "Eray" (3:35)
3. "Tellement N'Brick" (3:59)
4. "Dis-Moi" (3:51)
5. "Omri" (4:40)
6. "La Valse" (5:02)
7. "Baïda" (4:05)
8. "Miskin" (3:34)
9. "Abadou" (4:24)
10. "N'Sel Fik" (5:38)
11. "Ma Vie" (5:16)
12. "Tellement N'Brick" (Hip Hop Remix) (4:03)
13. "Baïda" (Orientale Version) (5:04)

== Charts ==
Chart	Peak position
French Albums Chart (SNEP)	25
Belgian Albums Chart (Wallonia)	24

== Certifications ==
Region	Certification	Certified units/sales
Belgium (BRMA)	Gold	25,000^{*}
France (SNEP)	2× Gold	200,000^{*}
^{*} Sales figures based on certification alone.
