= Olé, Olé (Rachid Taha album) =

1995 studio album by Rachid Taha

Studio album by Rachid Taha
- Released: 1995
- Length: 47:40
- Label: Mango, Barclay
- Producer: Steve Hillage

Rachid Taha chronology
| Rachid Taha (1993) | Olé, Olé (1995) | Carte Blanche (1997) |

Professional ratings
Review scores
| Source | Rating |
|---|---|
| Allmusic | 3/5 stars |

Olé, Olé is the third studio album by Algerian singer Rachid Taha. It was released by Mango Records in 1995. It was reissued in 1996 by Barclay Records with an alternate track listing. Valencia features the singing of Kirsty Hawkshaw.

== Track listing ==
All tracks are written by Rachid Taha, except where noted

Mango Release
| No. | Title | Writer(s) | Length |
|---|---|---|---|
| 1. | "Valencia" | Rachid Taha, Steve Hillage | 4:48 |
| 2. | "Nokta" | | 5:14 |
| 3. | "Baadini" | | 5:19 |
| 4. | "Comme un Chien" | | 4:49 |
| 5. | "Boire" | | 4:13 |
| 6. | "Zaâma" | | 3:59 |
| 7. | "Tabla Motown" | | 5:46 |
| 8. | "Jungle Fiction" | Rachid Taha, Steve Hillage | 4:03 |
| 9. | "Kelma" | | 4:51 |
| 10. | "Olé, Olé" | | 4:35 |

Barclay Re-release
| No. | Title | Writer(s) | Length |
|---|---|---|---|
| 1. | "Valencia" | Rachid Taha, Steve Hillage | 4:48 |
| 2. | "Nokta" | | 5:14 |
| 3. | "Baadini" | | 5:19 |
| 4. | "Comme un Chien" | | 4:49 |
| 5. | "Boire" | | 4:13 |
| 6. | "Zaâma" | | 3:59 |
| 7. | "Tabla Motown" | | 5:46 |
| 8. | "Non non non" (Multinational Version) | | 4:10 |
| 9. | "Jungle Fiction" | Rachid Taha, Steve Hillage | 4:03 |
| 10. | "Kelma" | | 4:51 |
| 11. | "Non non non" | | 4:10 |
| 12. | "Olé, Olé" | | 4:35 |

== Personnel ==
- Rachid Taha - lead vocals, guitar
- Steve Hillage - guitar, mixing, producer, programming, remixing
- Aziz Ben Salam- flute sodi guitar, programming
- Nabil Khalidi - banjo, bendir, lute, backing vocals
- Steve Conn – accordion, Dinesh percussion, tabla
- Leo "E-Zee-Kill" Williams - bass
- Martin Ditcham - percussion, tambourine
- Geoffrey Richardson - viola, violin
- Geoff Dugmore - drums
- Hagag Kenway - percussion
- Helen Liebmann - cello
- John Eacott - trumpet
- Jim Abbiss - engineer, keyboards, mixing, producer
- Yves Aouizerate - arranger, programming
- Kirsty Hawkshaw - vocals, backing vocals
- Dave Watts - vocals
