= Barbès (album) =

1990 studio album by Rachid Taha

Studio album by Rachid Taha
- Released: 1990
- Genre: Raï
- Label: Barclay
- Producer: Godwin Logie

Rachid Taha chronology
Barbès (1990)	Rachid Taha (1993)

Singles from Barbès
- 1. "Barbès" Released: 1990

Barbès is the debut album by French–Algerian singer Rachid Taha. It was released by Barclay Records in 1990.

A video clip was made for the title track Barbès and it was also released as a single, the title track features a sample of song Batwanees Beek by Warda.

== Track listing ==
All songs written and composed by Rachid Taha.

1. "Confiance" – 5:40
2. "Barbès" – 4:25
3. "Gazelle" – 4:41
4. "Lela" – 4:24
5. "Je Le Sais (Je Le Sens)" with Cheba Noria – 3:30
6. "Arab Rap" – 6:20
7. "Lyeh" – 5:28
8. "Bled" – 4:25
9. "Enti Wa Ana" – 3:37
10. "Partir" – 3:57
11. "Arab Dub" – 6:30
12. "Confiance Dub" – 5:40

== Personnel ==
- Lucien Athanase – keyboards
- Nathalie Baylaucq – design
- Christian Brun – guitars
- Xavier Jouvelet – percussion
- Nabil Ibn Khalidi – oud, banjo, bendio
- Godwin Logie – production
- Martial Macaugle – drums
- Yovo M'Bouele – bass
- Miloud – violin
- Najette – background vocals
- Cheba Noria – vocals
- Jean-Pierre Rodella – photography
- Rachid Taha – vocals
