= Tékitoi =

2004 studio album by Rachid Taha

Studio album by Rachid Taha
- Released: 21 September 2004
- Genre: raï; rock
- Length: 72:48
- Label: Barclay, Universal
- Producer: Steve Hillage

Rachid Taha chronology
Rachid Taha Live (2001)	Tékitoi (2004)	Diwan 2 (2006)

Professional ratings
Review scores
Source	Rating
Allmusic	link
Pitchfork Media	(7.8/10) link
PopMatters	(9/10) link
Robert Christgau	A−

Tékitoi is a studio album released in 2004 by the Algerian musician Rachid Taha. The title is a nonstandard spelling of the French question "Tu es qui, toi?" which might be pronounced in speech as "T'es qui, toi?" (IPA: [te ki twa]) and, in the context of this song, means "Who do you think you are?" informally.

The lyrics are mainly in French and Arabic. The booklet to the CD includes full sung texts in Arabic in romanization with French and English translations.

The album features guest appearances by Brian Eno, Christian Olivier, Kaha Beri, Julien Jacob, and Bruno Maman.

A video clip was made for "Tékitoi?"

On March 5, 2011, the song "Tékitoi?" was used on Saturday Night Live in a dancing French skit called "Les Jeunes de Paris."

== Track listing ==
1. "Tékitoi?" (Who are You?) - Duet with Christian Olivier
2. "Rock el Casbah" (Arabic cover version of Rock the Casbah by The Clash)
3. "Lli Fat Mat!" (What Is Past Is Dead and Gone!)
4. "H'asbu-Hum" (Ask Them For An Explanation)
5. "Safi" (Pure)
6. "Meftuh'" (Open)
7. "Winta" - with Kaha Beri
8. "Nah'seb" (I Count)
9. "Dima" (Always) - with Julien Jacob
10. "Mamachi"
11. "Shuf" (Look)
12. "Stenna" (Wait)
13. "Ya Rayah"
14. "Voilà Voilà" (Here It Is, Here It Is) - Spanish version

== Charts ==
Charts (2004)	Peak position
French Albums Chart	63

== Personnel ==
- Rachid Taha: Composer, Primary Artist
- Leo Abrahams: Guitar (Bass)
- Joshua Adel: Vocals
- Kamilya Adli: Choir/Chorus, Vocals, Vocals (Background)
- Christopher Allan: Cello
- Ali Bensadoun: Gallal, Gasba, Ney, Raita
- Casbah Boys: Choir/Chorus, Vocals
- Duchess Nell Catchpole: Violin
- Francois Delfin: Guitar, Slide Guitar
- Alison Dodds: Violin
- Egyptian String Ensemble: Strings
- Brian Eno: Composer, Drums, Synthesizer, Vocals
- Adel Eskander: Violin
- Hakim Hamadouche: Banjo, Lute
- Ashraf Heikal: Violin
- Steve Hillage: Arranger, Audio Production, Composer, Guitar, Mixing, Producer, Programming, String Arrangements, Vocals
- Julien Jacob: Guitar (Acoustic)
- Hakim Kaci: Keyboards
- Said Kama: String Arrangements, Violin
- Yahya Mahdi: Cello, Violin
- Bruno Maman: Engineer, Guitar, Keyboards, Producer, Programming, String Arrangements
- Anwar Mansey: Violin
- Abdel Wahab Mansy: Violin
- Mostafa Mansy: Cello
- Nacera Mesbah: Choir/Chorus, Vocals (Background)
- Mostafa Abdel Naby: Violin
- Christian Olivier: Composer, Vocals
- Hossam Ramzy: Percussion, String Director
- Aziz Ben Salam: Flute
- Dr. Maggid Serour: Qanoun, Quanun
- Alex Toff: Drums
- Karima Yahiaoui: Choir/Chorus, Vocals (Background)
