= Diwân =

1998 studio album by Rachid Taha

Studio album by Rachid Taha
- Released: May 26, 1998
- Genre: Raï
- Length: 69:16
- Label: Barclay
- Producer: Steve Hillage

Rachid Taha chronology
Carte Blanche (1997)	Diwân (1998)	1,2,3 Soleils (1999)

Professional ratings
Review scores
Source	Rating
Allmusic	link
Robert Christgau	A−

Diwân is a studio album released in 1998 by Franco-Algerian raï artist Rachid Taha. In contrast to his earlier releases, Diwân contains less rock and punk music, and features more traditional Arabic instruments. Many of the songs are about the founding fathers of raï music, and the lyrics are in Arabic and French.

A video clip was made for "Ida".

== Track listing ==
#	Title	Songwriters	Length
1	"Ya Rayah"	Abderrahmane Amrani	6:13
2	"Ida"	Rachid Taha	5:56
3	"Habina"	Toufic Barakat, Farid al-Atrache	7:27
4	"Bent Sahra"	Ahmed Khelifi	7:12
5	"Ach Adani"	Abderrahmane Amrani	6:25
6	"El H'Mame"	Mohammed El Anka	6:07
7	"Enti Rahti"	Abderrahmane Amrani	6:58
8	"Menfi"	Missoum Amraoui, Akli Yahiatene	5:03
9	"Bani Al Insane"	Boudjemaa Hgour	4:32
10	"Malheureux Toujours"	Benaceur Baghdadi, Ahmed Soulimane	6:13
11	"Aiya Aiya"	Rachid Taha	7:00

== Charts ==
Chart (1998)	Peak position
French Albums Chart	52

== Personnel ==
- Rachid Taha - vocals
- Amina Alaoui - vocals
- Steve Hillage - engineer, guitar, mixing, producer, programming
- Kaseeme Jalanne - oud
- Nabil Khalidi - banjo, oud, percussion, backing vocals
- Bob Loveday - strings
- Pete Macgowan - strings
- Hossam Ramzy - percussion
- Geoffrey Richardson - strings
- Aziz Ben Salem - flute
