= Mon Pays (Faudel song) =

Single by Faudel

from the album Mundial Corrida
- B-side: "Remix"
- Released: 13 November 2006
- Recorded: 2006
- Genre: Pop
- Length: 3:45
- Label: Mercury
- Songwriter(s): Asdorve; Faudel Lebovici
- Producer(s): Volodia; Fred Chateau

Faudel singles chronology
"Je n'ai que mon coeur" (2004)	"Mon Pays" (2006)

"Mon Pays" is a 2006 song recorded by French-born artist Faudel. It was the first single from his album Mundial Corrida, produced by Fred Chateau and Volodia. Released on 13 November 2006, the song was a huge hit in France and Belgium (Wallonia).

== Song information ==
In this song, Faudel affirms his double French and Algerian identity and celebrates his two cultures. This song received extensive airplay on radio and TV (number 29 on the 2006 Airplay Chart and number 19 on the TV Chart). In France, the single debuted directly at number one on 11 November 2006, then dropped and remained for ten weeks in the top ten and 38 weeks on the chart. As of August 2014, it is the 66th best-selling single of the 21st century in France, with 356,000 units sold. In Belgium, "Mon Pays" ranked for 28 weeks in the top 40, 18 of them in the top ten and one week atop.

== Track listings ==
CD single

1. "Mon Pays" (radio) — 3:45
2. "Mon Pays" (remix) — 3:44

Digital download

1. "Mon Pays" (radio) — 3:45
2. "Mon Pays" (remix) — 3:44
3. "Mon Pays" (karaoke) — 3:48

== Charts ==
=== Weekly charts ===
Chart (2005/06)	Peak position
Belgian (Wallonia) Singles Chart	1
Eurochart Hot 100	6
French Digital Chart	1
French SNEP Singles Chart	1
Swiss Singles Chart	19

=== Year-end charts ===
Chart (2006)	Position
Belgian (Wallonia) Singles Chart	33
French Digital Chart	15
French Singles Chart	10
Chart (2007)	Position
Belgian (Wallonia) Singles Chart	20
French Singles Chart	32

== Certifications ==
Certifications for "Mon Pays"
Region	Certification	Certified units/sales
Belgium (BRMA)	Gold	25,000^{*}
^{*} Sales figures based on certification alone.
