= Zoom (Rachid Taha album) =

2013 studio album by Rachid Taha

Studio album by Rachid Taha
- Released: 2 April 2013
- Genre: Raï, rock, world
- Label: Wrasse
- Producer: Justin Adams

Rachid Taha chronology
Bonjour (2009)	Zoom (2013)

Singles from Zoom
- 1. "Now or Never" Released: 15 January 2013; 2. "Wesh (N'amal)" Released: 25 March 2013

Professional ratings
Review scores
Source	Rating
The Guardian	4/5 stars
The Independent	5/5 stars
Robert Christgau	A

Zoom is the ninth and final studio album by French–Algerian singer Rachid Taha, prior to his death in 2018. It was released by Wrasse Records on 2 April 2013. It was produced by guitarist Justin Adams, with featured guests Mick Jones and Brian Eno. Jones also toured with Rachid Taha as part of the Zoom project.

"Now or Never" (words & music by Aaron Schroeder & Wally Gold and previously recorded by Elvis Presley) features Jeanne Added singing in English. The video clip was directed by Marc-Antoine Serra and was shot in Naples. A video clip was also made for "Voilà, Voilà".

== Track listing ==
1. "Wesh (N'amal)"
2. "Zoom sur oum"
3. "Jamila"
4. "Now or Never"
5. "Fakir"
6. "Ana"
7. "Les artistes"
8. "Khalouni/Ya oumri"
9. "Algerian Tango"
10. "Galbi"
11. "Voilà voilà"

== Personnel ==
- Rachid Taha – vocals
- Billy Fuller – bass
- Justin Adams – guitar
- Mick Jones – guitar
- Rodolphe Burger – guitar
- Hakim Hamadouche – lute
- Brian Eno – percussion, bass, brass, vocals
- Jeanne Added - featured vocalist on "Now or Never"
