= Samra (album) =

Studio album by Faudel
- Released: 6 February 2001
- Length: 55:04
- Language: Arabic, french
- Label: Universal Music Division Mercury Records

Faudel chronology
1,2,3 Soleils (1999)	Samra (2001)	Un Autre Soleil (2003)

Samra (Arabic : سمرة) is the second studio album by the French raï singer Faudel. released on February 6, 2001.

== Description ==
The album contains 13 tracks produced by Nabil Khalidi and Goh Hotoda and most of the songs are composed by Faudel, he will also be joined by his friend, the composer of "Tellement je t'aime" Samir Bouchakara, which composes two titles: Je me souviens and Mantes-la-Jolie.

The album is distinguished by a strong desire for musical mixing and builds a bridge between North Africa and the world because it contains many musical styles Like techno-funk in Rohi, hip-hop in Mantes la jolie, and arabic folklore in Paris - Le Caire.

== Track list ==
1. "Lila" (3:56)
2. "Aveugle par l'amour" (3:50)
3. "La main dans la main" (4:15)
4. "Salsa Rai (Sin Cadena)" (4:11)
5. "Raha" (3:58)
6. "Mantes la jolie" (3:22)
7. "Je me souviens" (5:48)
8. "Couleurs de ton âme" (4:00)
9. "Hanina" (4:52)
10. "Rohi" (3:53)
11. "Samra" (4:24)
12. "Si tu le veux" (3:36)
13. "Paris le Caire" (5:01)

== Charts ==
Chart	Peak position
French Albums Chart (SNEP)	27
Belgian Albums Chart (BEA)	27
Swiss Albums Chart (SH)	75
