= 1,2,3 Soleils =

1999 live album by Rachid Taha, Khaled and Faudel

1, 2, 3

Live album by Rachid Taha, Khaled and Faudel
- Released: 17 November 1998
- Recorded: 26 September 1998
- Venue: Palais Omnisports de Paris-Bercy (Paris)
- Genre: Raï
- Length: 96:44
- Label: Barclay
- Producer: Steve Hillage

Rachid Taha chronology
Dîwan (1998)	1, 2, 3 (1998)	Made in Medina (2000)

Khaled chronology
Hafla (1998)	1, 2, 3 Soleils (1999)	Kenza (1999)

Faudel chronology
Baïda (1997)	1, 2, 3 Soleils (1999)	Samra (2001)

1, 2, 3 Soleils (transl. 1, 2, 3 Suns) is a live album by Algerian singers Rachid Taha, Khaled and Faudel, widely hailed as the three masters of raï music. The concert, a unique event, took place in 1998 in Palais Omnisports de Paris-Bercy in Paris, and the songs consisted of the most famous from all three artists plus a few Algerian classics. All 23 were divided into two discs, produced and arranged by Steve Hillage, released by Barclay in 1999.

The album has attained 2× gold certification and the DVD video has attained gold certification from Syndicat National de l'Edition Phonographique.

A shortened US one compact disc release of the album was released by Ark 21.

== Track listing ==
Disc One
No.	Title	Lead vocals	Length
1.	"Khalliouni Khalliouni"	Instrumental	5:39
2.	"Menfi"	Taha, Khaled, Faudel	5:41
3.	"Eray"	Faudel, Khaled	4:40
4.	"N'ssi N'ssi"	Khaled	5:14
5.	"Ida"	Taha	7:08
6.	"Baida"	Faudel	5:42
7.	"Omri"	Faudel, Taha	5:44
8.	"Voilà Voilà"	Taha, Faudel, Khaled	5:50
9.	"Indie"	Taha, Khaled	5:38
10.	"Chebba"	Khaled, Taha, Faudel	5:30
11.	"Sahra"	Khaled	4:42

Disc Two
No.	Title	Lead vocals	Length
1.	"Madeeh"	Khaled	7:24
2.	"Wahrane Wahrane"	Khaled	4:58
3.	"Les Ailes"	Khaled	5:14
4.	"La Camel"	Khaled, Faudel	5:28
5.	"Abdel Kader"	Khaled, Taha, Faudel	5:12
6.	"Bent Sahra"	Khaled, Taha	7:21
7.	"Aïcha"	Khaled, Faudel	6:51
8.	"Tellement N'Brick"	Faudel	9:10
9.	"Didi"	Khaled, Taha, Faudel	6:08
10.	"Ya Rayah"	Taha, Khaled, Faudel	7:28
11.	"Daiman" (Bonus)	Taha, Khaled, Faudel	4:15
12.	"Comme d'Habitude" (Bonus)	Taha, Khaled, Faudel	4:15

== Professional rating ==
Allmusic rated it 4 out of 5.

== Personnel ==
Khaled, Faudel and Rachid Taha were supported by:

- Zachary Alford - drums
- Aziz Ben Salam - ney flute
- Elsa Benabdallah - violin
- Mohamed Bendjebour - guitar
- Djaffar Bensetti - trumpet
- Farhat Bouallagui - arranger, string arrangements, violin
- Christophe Briquet - viola
- Karen Brunon - leader, string director, violin
- Mathieu Chédid - guitar
- Mohsein Chentouf - bendir, darbouka, backing vocals
- Simon Clarke - baritone saxophone
- Khaled Dagher - cello
- Gail Ann Dorsey - bass, backing vocals
- Adel Eskande - violin
- Guillaume Fontanarosa - violin
- Steve Hillage - arranger, engineer, mixing, producer, string arrangements
- Allen Hoist - alto and tenor saxophone
- Hazem Ibrahim - violin
- Randy Jacobs - guitar
- Nabil Khalidi - banjo, oud, backing vocals
- Hassan Lachal - darbouka
- Sylvain Le Provost - double bass
- Roddy Lorimer - trumpet
- Abdel Wahab Mansy - violin
- Jean-Max Mery - keyboards
- Christophe Morin - cello
- Hossam Ramzy - director, orchestra director, percussion
- Geoffrey Richardson - string arrangements, viola
- Medhat Abdel Samie - violin
- Tim Sanders - soprano and tenor saxophone
- Mahmoud Serour - string arrangements
- Mark London Sims - trombone
- Taha Taha - cello
- Yasser Taha - cello
- Ihab Tutu - violin
- Marylene Vinciguerra - viola
- Tamer Yassin - violin
