= Akli Yahiatene =

Algerian singer (born 1933)

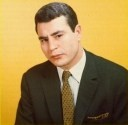
Akli Yahiatene

Akli Yahiatene (born in 1933) is an Amazigh-Kabyle singer, from Algeria. He was born in Aït-Mendes, near Boghni (wilaya of Tizi Ouzou), and emigrated to France in the 1950s, where he worked in Citroën plants and supported the Algerian Front de libération nationale (FLN), for which he was put in jail several times where he composed many songs. His popularity lasted from the 1950s to the 1970s.
