= Bonjour (album) =

2009 studio album by Rachid Taha

Studio album by Rachid Taha
- Released: 26 October 2009
- Genre: Raï, rock, world
- Label: Wrasse, Universal
- Producer: Gaetan Roussel & Mark Plati

Rachid Taha chronology
Rock N Raï (2008)	Bonjour (2009)	Zoom (2013)

Singles from Bonjour
- 1. "Bonjour" Released: 13 July 2009

Bonjour is the eighth studio album by French–Algerian singer Rachid Taha. It was released by Wrasse Records on 26 October 2009.

== Critical response ==
Professional ratings
Review scores
Source	Rating
AllMusic	3/5 stars
The Guardian	3/5 stars
Financial Times	3/5 stars
MSN Music (Consumer Guide)	A
Pitchfork	7.5/10
Socialist Worker	(positive)

Bonjour received mixed reviews from music critics. The Guardian reviewer Robin Denselow called the album a "A highly commercial set" that was "not [Taha's] most exciting." David Honigmann of the Financial Times rated the album three out of five stars, but wrote that its emphasis on "technology...stops [Taha] cutting loose."

== Songs ==
"Je t'aime mon amour", Bonjour's opening track, was written about Taha's partner. Its lyrics are a declaration of love for life and his partner. The second track, "Mokhtar", describes the lonely life of a vagrant living in a city. "Ha Baby" was inspired by country music singer Kenny Rogers and Egyptian musician Farid El Atrache. The song, which blends western and Arabic musical styles, is about universal peace and love. The title track, "Bonjour", is a duet with Gaetan Roussel. It was released as the album's lead single and is sung in both French and Arabic. "Mine Jaï", the fifth track, asks a series of questions. In the song, Taha asks the listener where they come from and where they are traveling to.

In the song "Mabrouk Aalik", Taha reflects on the fractured relationship between Jews and Muslims. The seventh track, "Ila Lika", explores life and death. "It's an Arabian Song" is a rock song about the French treatment of Algerians during colonialism. The track features fellow Algerian singer Bruno Maman. "Sélu" is a flamenco song that pays tribute Arab writers and philosophers such as Averroes and Naguib Mahfouz. The album closes with "Agi", a ballad about love.

== Track listing ==
1. "Je t'aime mon amour"
2. "Mokhtar"
3. "Ha Baby"
4. "Bonjour" with Gaetan Roussel
5. "Mine Jaï"
6. "Mabrouk Aalik"
7. "Ila Lika"
8. "It's an Arabian Song" with Bruno Maman
9. "Sélu"
10. "Agi"

== Charts ==
Chart (2009)	Peak position
French Albums Chart	132

== Release history ==
Region	Date	Label	Format(s)	Catalog
Europe	19 October 2009	Wrasse Records	Digital download	Wrass251
Europe	26 October 2009	Wrasse Records	CD	Wrass251

== Personnel ==
- Rachid Taha: Composer, Primary Artist
- Sylvain Bernard: Clapping, Keyboards, Organ, Piano, Piano (Electric), Vocals (Background)
- Everett Bradley: Vocals (Background)
- Rodolphe Burger: Guitar (Electric)
- Marc Copely: Guitar (Acoustic), Guitar (Electric), Vocals (Background)
- Hakim Hamadouche: Arranger, Banjo, Guitar (Acoustic), Vocals (Background)
- Steve Hillage: Arranger
- Bruno Maman: Composer, Featured Artist, Guitar (Electric), Interpretation, Synthesizer Bass, Synthesizer Strings, Vocals
- Karim Mansour: Guitar (Electric)
- Morgan Marchand: Clapping, Drum Programming, Keyboards, Percussion Programming, Synthesizer Bass
- Konrad Meissner: Drums
- Daniel Mintseris: Harmonium, Keyboards
- Mark Plati: Bass, Guitar (Acoustic), Guitar (Electric), Keyboards, Loops, Mixing, Producer, Programming, Synthesizer Bass, Vocals (Background)
- Nicki Richards: Vocals (Background)
- Gaëtan Roussel: Composer, Featured Artist, Guitar (Acoustic), Guitar (Electric), Interpretation, Keyboards, Loops, Piano, Producer, Vocals (Background)
- Catherine Russell: Vocals (Background)
- Arthur Simon: Trumpet
- Sóley: Clapping, Guitar (Acoustic), Guitar (Electric), Vocals (Background)
