= Made in Medina =

2000 studio album by Rachid Taha

Studio album by Rachid Taha
- Released: 2000
- Genres: Worldbeat, raï, alternative dance
- Length: 63:52
- Label: Barclay
- Producer: Steve Hillage

Rachid Taha chronology
1,2,3 Soleils (1999)	Made in Medina (2000)	Rachid Taha Live (2001)

Professional ratings
Review scores
Source	Rating
AllMusic	4.5/5 stars
Robert Christgau	A−

Made in Medina is a studio album by French-Algerian raï artist Rachid Taha. It was released in 2000 by Barclay Records and produced and arranged by Steve Hillage. Five of the songs were subsequently featured in Taha's live album.

A video clip was made for "Hey Anta".

== Critical reception ==
AllMusic wrote that "while it may sound like a shopping list for an international emporium, in fact, Medina has an extremely coherent sound, built on prominent, danceable rhythms, strong melodies, and powerful vocals, all shot through with a Middle Eastern flavor." The Washington Post called the album "an ecstatic union of Algerian rai and Western rock, techno and funk."

== Track listing ==
1. "Barra Barra" – 5:48
2. "Foqt Foqt" – 6:10
3. "Medina" (album version) – 5:39
4. "Ala Jalkoum" – 4:55 - with Femi Kuti
5. "Aïe Aïe Aïe" – 6:30
6. "Hey Anta" – 4:30
7. "Qalantiqa" – 5:22
8. "En Retard" – 4:56
9. "Vérité" – 6:06
10. "Ho Chérie Chérie" – 5:30
11. "Garab" – 8:19

== Charts ==
Chart (2000)	Peak position
French Albums Chart	38

== Personnel ==
- Rachid Taha - lead vocals
- Steve Hillage - arranger, lead and rhythm guitars, mixing, producer, programming, string arrangements
- Jeff Raines - guitar
- Hakim Hamadouche - mandolute, backing vocals
- Robert Mercurio - bass
- Geoff Richardson - viola
- Mahmoud Serour - string arrangements, violin
- Bob Loveday - violin
- Helen Liebmann - cello
- Richard Vogel - keyboards
- Jean-Max Mery - keyboards
- Femi Kuti - saxophone, vocals
- Abdel Abrit - drums
- Stanton Moore - drums
- Hossam Ramzy - percussion, string arrangements
- Hassan Lachal - percussion
