= Dahmane El Harrachi =

Dahmane El Harrachi دحمان الحرّاشي

Background information
- Also known as: Dahmane El Harrachi
- Born: Abderrahmane Amrani; July 7, 1926; El Biar, Algiers, French Algeria
- Died: August 31, 1980 (aged 54) Aïn Bénian, Algiers, Algeria
- Genres: Chaabi
- Occupations: Singer, song-writer, instrumentalist
- Instruments: Banjos, violins (alto), mandole, derbouka, tar
- Years active: 1956–1980
- Website: Dahmane El Harrachi Website

Dahmane El Harrachi (real name Abderrahmane Amrani), (July 7, 1926 – August 31, 1980), was an Algerian Chaâbi singer of Chaoui origin. His song Ya Rayah made him one of the best exported and translated Chaabi artist.

He moved to France in 1949 living in Lille, then Marseille, before eventually settling in Paris. It was in Paris where he made a name for himself, playing in the numerous Algerian cafés there.

== Personal ==
His father, originally from the Chaoui village of Djellal in the province of Khenchla, was the muezzin at the Djamaa el Kebir mosque in Algiers.

In 2009, his son Kamel El Harrachi issued a homage CD to his father, titled "Ghana Fenou".

== Influence ==
El Harrachi's music brought a modern touch to châabi, incorporating themes like immigrant struggle and longing for one's homeland into his songs, of which he wrote over 500. He has served as an inspiration to a generation of Algerian raï artists, including Rachid Taha.

== Death ==
He died on August 31, 1980, in a car accident on the highway in Algiers. He is buried at the El Kettar Cemetery.
