= Justin Adams =

English guitarist and composer (born 1961)

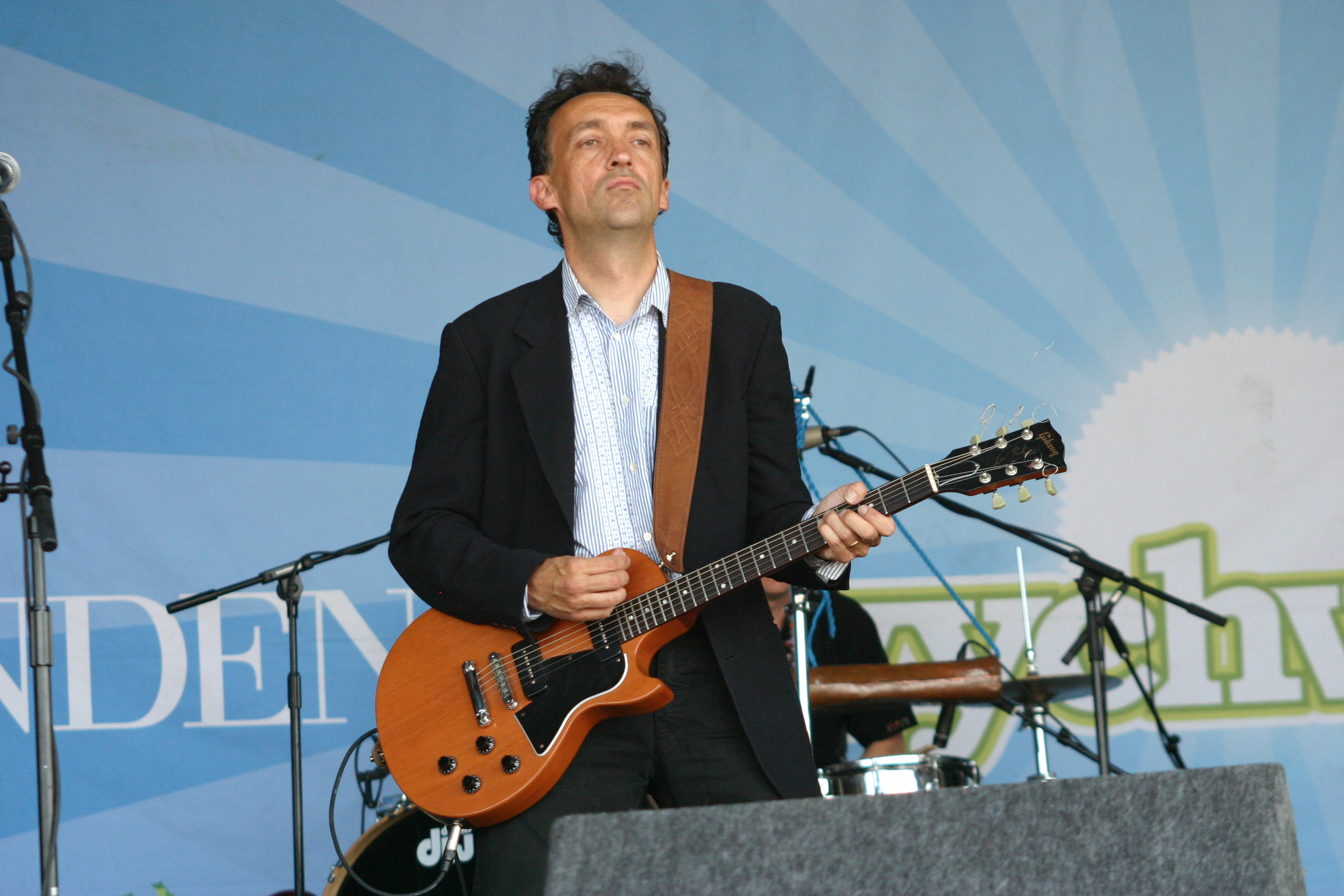
- Adams performing in 2009

Background information
- Birth name: Justin Alexander Adams
- Born: 22 July 1961 (age 63); Westminster, London, England
- Genres: World music
- Occupation: Musician
- Instrument: Guitar
- Years active: Mid-1980s–present
- Labels: Wayward; Real World; World Village
- Formerly of: The Impossible Dreamers

Justin Alexander Adams (born 22 July 1961) is an English guitarist and composer who works in blues and African styles.

== Biography ==
Born in London, the son of a diplomat, Adams spent some of his early childhood growing up in Egypt, before returning with his family to England.

He began his career in music in the 1980s with the band the Impossible Dreamers. He then joined Jah Wobble's Invaders of the Heart.

His first solo album was Desert Road in 2001, and he also wrote the score for Elaine Proctor's 2000 film Kin.

Adams co-wrote the 2005 Robert Plant album Mighty ReArranger, and is a producer. He has worked with Saharan desert blues group Tinariwen, whose first and third albums he produced, Robert Plant's Strange Sensation band, and has collaborated with Brian Eno, Sinéad O'Connor, Lo'Jo and musicians from African, Arabic and Irish traditions.

From 2007, he collaborated with Gambian griot Juldeh Camara (sometimes under the name 'JUJU'), resulting in the albums Soul Science, Tell No Lies (which won a Songlines 'Cross-Cultural Collaboration' award), The Trance Sessions, and In Trance. He also recorded with Ben Mandelson and Lu Edmonds as Les Triaboliques, releasing the album rivermudtwilight (2009). He produced the 2013 Zoom album of Rachid Taha.

In 2014, he performed with Robert Plant at Glastonbury Festival.

== Personal life ==
Adams and his wife have two children.

== Discography ==
- Desert Road (2001), Wayward
- Kin: The Original Motion Picture Soundtrack (2001), Wayward
- Soul Science (2007), Wayward - Justin Adams & Juldeh Camara
- Tell No Lies (2009), Real World - Justin Adams & Juldeh Camara
- rivermudtwilight (2009), World Village - Les Triaboliques
- The Trance Sessions (2010), Real World - Justin Adams & Juldeh Camara
- In Trance (2011), Real World - JUJU
- Ribbons (2017), Wayward/DJA Records - Justin Adams & Anneli Drecker
- Still Moving (2021), Rough Trade - Justin Adams & Mauro Durante
- Sweet Release (2024), Ponderosa Music & Art - Justin Adams & Mauro Durante
