= Faudel =

French singer (born 1978)

Faudel فضيل
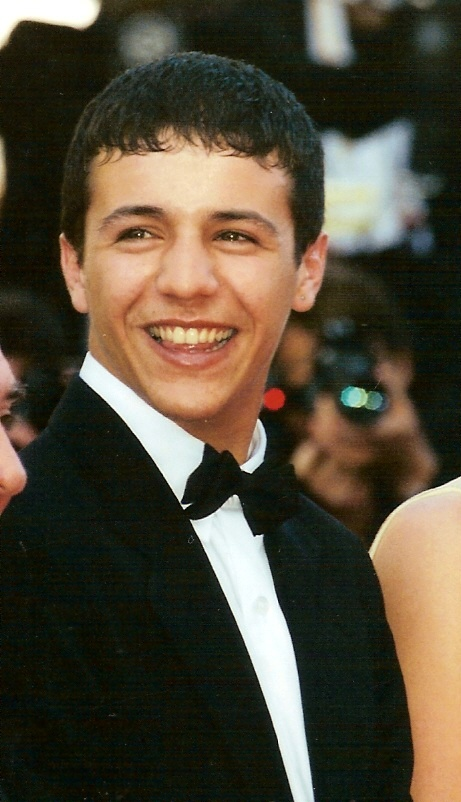
- Faudel at the 1999 Cannes Film Festival

Background information
- Also known as: The Little Prince of Raï (Le petit prince du raï)
- Born: Faudel Belloua; June 6, 1978 (age 48); Paris, France
- Genres: Raï, pop, R&B
- Occupations: Singer, actor
- Label: Mercury/Universal
- Website: faudel.net

Faudel Belloua (Arabic: فُضيل بيلوى; born June 6, 1978) is a French raï singer and actor of Algerian descent. He released multiple studio albums, notably Baïda, Samra, Un Autre Soleil and Mundial Corrida and the live album 1,2,3 Soleils jointly with Khaled and Rachid Taha.

== Biography ==
=== Early years ===
Born in Mantes-la-Jolie, a suburb of Paris, and raised by Algerian-born immigrant parents in the Val Fourré neighborhood, the young Faudel was introduced to Algerian raï by his grandmother who performed regularly in Oran with the meddahates, groups of female musicians who play traditional folk raï at weddings and other family occasions. It was Amaria, Faudel's grandmother, who was largely responsible for teaching him traditional raï rhythms during the summer holidays in Algeria.

His first public singing experience was during a family wedding celebration in Oran, Algeria. Faudel started to cover the popular tracks by Cheb Khaled and Cheb Mami at 12, after which he soon fronted the popular band Les Etoiles du Raï (The Rai Stars). Faudel and Les Etoiles du Rai soon became a well-known fixture at the youth club and other local associations in Mantes-la-Jolie. Faudel then went on to appear at clubs throughout the Paris suburbs, performing covers of Khaled, Zahouania and Mami's greatest hits, accompanied by a pre-recorded backing tape.

The turning-point of Faudel's early career came at the age of 13 when he was spotted at Printemps de Bourges by Mohamed Mestar (aka Momo). Mestar, an ex-guitarist, had recently set up an association in the suburbs to promote up-and-coming local artists and, after catching one of Faudel's concerts, he offered to take charge of the young Rai singer's career. Thanks to Momo's guiding hand, Faudel soon built up his own repertoire and began collaborating with different artists, and playing in a few Cheb Mami and MC Solaar concerts as well. Faudel went on to study accountancy and metallurgy, but his passion for Rai soon led to him taking up a professional singing career.

Faudel's debut album, Baïda, was released in 1997. A year later, he was invited to sing with Khaled and Rachid Taha in the 1, 2, 3 Soleils concert in Paris. His collaboration with them made him a household name in France and Algeria.

Even though Faudel was still in his early teens, he managed to establish himself as the new voice of Rai. Indeed, in 1995 two French television documentaries were made about the rising young star from Mantes-la-Jolie - Saga cités (which was broadcast on the state-owned channel France 3) and Les Enfants du Rai (broadcast on the Franco-German channel Arte). The following year Faudel would be chosen to represent the Ile-de-France region at the prestigious Printemps de Bourges Festival. And the young singer's impressive performance in the New Talent category would only serve to increase his growing popularity.

Meanwhile, Faudel embarked on a new series of concert tours while Momo set about getting his young protégé a recording deal. In order to produce the best demo tape possible, Momo and Faudel flew out to New York in January 1996 to record three tracks with session musicians at the legendary Record Plant studios. The demo tape would actually prove unnecessary - after Faudel's impressive performance at the Printemps de Bourges, the young star was snapped up by major record label Mercury shortly afterward. Faudel's original sound - which fuses traditional Amazigh Rai rhythms with 'new wave' guitar, reggae, Afro-beat and vibrant flamenco rhythms - was now set to hit the big time.

After signing a contract with Mercury to produce five albums over the next few years, Faudel decided to quit school. The young singer then embarked upon another major concert tour, performing dates throughout France and Europe. In the course of this new tour Faudel would appear in concert with a number of legendary Rai stars such as Khaled and Cheb Mami. Meanwhile, Faudel's catchy new Rai sound would reach a whole new audience when it was used as part of the soundtrack to Ariel Zeitoun's film Elle est Belle la Vie.

=== Baïda ===
Faudel soon caught on with the French media too, journalists and music critics dubbing him (The Little Prince of Rai). The Little Prince of Rai soon went into the studio to record his début album Baïda (Blonde). Released in October 1997, Faudel's album combined a "light" modern Rai style with hard-hitting lyrics. (Faudel's songs deal with everything from broken hearts to the problems of France's second-generation immigrants). The first single release from the album, "Tellement N'brick" (I Love You So Much), went on to become a huge hit on community radio during the Muslim month of Ramadan (January 1998).

Following the success of "Tellement N'brick", Baïda was nominated in the 'traditional music' category at the Victoires de la Musique awards in February 1998. On April 15, Faudel was invited to perform at the Printemps de Bourges Festival once again.

Following the release of his début album, Faudel went on to perform a whole string of concerts, delighting music fans up and down the country. On September 26 the Little Prince of Rai appeared in concert with Khaled and Rachid Taha at Bercy stadium in Paris, attracting a crowd of 15,000 Rai fans. He then went on to continue his successful national tour. The live album of the Bercy concert (entitled 1.2.3. Soleils) proved to be an overwhelming success with the French public and the three Rai Tenors were soon inundated with invitations to appear on all the top TV shows.

His 1997 music video called "Tellement Je T'aime" featured Ukrainian born, model and actress, future "James Bond's girl" Olga Kurylenko.

At the beginning of 1999 the popular Rai trio were back in the limelight again with a new single. They had already performed the song - an Arabic adaptation of Jacques Revaux's legendary French classic "Comme d'habitude" (the French "My Way") - at their Bercy concert and the single proved instantly popular with French music fans. On 20 February 1999 the trio were invited to perform the song at the Victoires de la Musique (the annual French music awards). Faudel triumphed at the award ceremony that night, when television viewers voted him Best Newcomer of the Year. Following this triumph, Faudel went on to bring the house down when he performed two concerts at the Olympia on March 10 and 11.

In the summer of 1999, the young Rai star set off on a mini tour of Tunisia, performing six concerts which brought the famous "Faudel Tour" (the extensive international tour he had launched at the beginning of the year) to a triumphant end.

=== Samra ===
During the summer of 2000, Faudel performed at the Summer Stage Festival in New York.

Meanwhile, he went back to work on his next album, Samra. The album included 6 French and 7 Arabic songs. The Mercury release booklet contains sung texts in French and Arabic in romanization. The songs were written and arranged by Nabil Khalidi (a collaborator of Rachid Taha) and Goh Hotoda (a well-known remixer), and were produced by Mohamed Mestar who has been following Faudel since 1993. Samra remained faithful to the raï tradition, while presenting more synthetic rhythms and Arabic pop features, as well as new Latino touches—especially for the song "Salsa raï" performed in a duo with Yuri Buenaventura. More than in his previous albums, the lyrics focused on love rather than on his usual social comments, except for one track that referred to Mantes-la-Jolie, the inner-city where the artist grew up and still lives in. Released in February 2001, and following the great success of Baïda, which topped the 350,000 mark; this new album charted in France, Belgium and Switzerland.

=== Un Autre Soleil and Mundial Corrida ===
In 2003, the singer went back to the recording studio to work on a new album. On September 2, 2003, Faudel released Un Autre Soleil, his most mature album so far. The artist had to compromise with his record company that insisted on his producing an exclusively Arabic album, yet he also managed to impose songs in French. With the help of songwriter Patrick Dupond who had collaborated with Florent Pagny, Faudel composed very personal lyrics such as those of "Petit Etre" — dealing with his recently born son. Marion Michau penned the first single to be aired on the French radios "Je Veux Vivre". Bands like Zebda, the Négresses Vertes and Zen Zila also came to collaborate on the record. With a strong Mediterranean feel, the album should enable Faudel to meet with a larger and larger audience.

Faudel worked on a new album called Mundial Corrida. This, the Rai star's fourth album to date, was released in September 2006. On Mundial Corrida, produced by Fred Chateau and Volodia, Faudel affirmed his double French and Algerian identity, celebrating his two cultures on "Mon Pays", the first single release which received extensive airplay. The French singer, songwriter and composer Pascal Obispo also contributed several tracks to the album.

=== The Return ===
In 2017, Faudel recorded the bilingual Arabic and French language single "Rani" as a duo with singer Mohammed Assaf, who was the 2013 Arab Idol winner.

A track recorded in collaboration with RedOne, "All Day, All Night" was released on April 26, 2018.

On April 16, 2019, a new song was unveiled, Mon Dieu, follow it in 2020 with two songs Histoire Chaba and Smile.

== Acting career ==
Besides his singing career, the young star of Raï music decided to take a new turn towards acting and accepted a part in the French film, Battement d’ailes du papillon. Following that part, Faudel continued to read a lot of scripts, but remained on the lookout for the right part that would turn him into a star of the big screen.

As an actor he also took part in a television series entitled Sami. He played a Tunisian student working as a supervisor in a French high school.

In 2004, Faudel made a comeback on cinema screens, starring in Merzak Allouache's film Bab el web alongside Samy Naceri and Julie Gayet. He played the role of a young man from the Bab el Oued neighbourhood in Algiers.

== Personal life ==
Faudel has a trio of French, Moroccan and Algerian nationality. In February 2002, his partner gave birth to a boy named Enzy.

== Discography ==
=== Albums ===
Studio albums

| Title | Year | Peak | | | Certifications |
| Title | Year | BEL (Wa) | FRA | SWI | Certifications |
|---|---|---|---|---|---|
| Baïda | 1997 | 24 | 25 | — | FRA: 2× Gold BEL: Gold |
| Samra | 2001 | 27 | 27 | 75 | FRA: Gold |
| Un Autre Soleil | 2003 | 20 | 45 | — | |
| Mundial Corrida | 2006 | 15 | 6 | 88 | FRA: 2× Gold |
| Bled Memory | 2009 | — | 93 | — | |

Live albums

| Title | Year | Peak | | Certification |
| Title | Year | BEL (Wa) | FRA | Certification |
|---|---|---|---|---|
| 1,2,3 Soleils (Live with Khaled and Rachid Taha) | 1998 | 14 | 4 | FRA: 2× Gold |

Compilation albums Live albums

| Title | Year | Peak | | Certification |
| Title | Year | BEL (Wa) | FRA | Certification |
|---|---|---|---|---|
| L'essentiel | 2007 | 12 | — | |

=== Singles ===
| Title | Year | Peak | | | Album |
| Title | Year | BEL (Wa) | FRA | SWI | Album |
|---|---|---|---|---|---|
| "Tellement N'brick (Tellement je t'aime)" | 1997 | — | 14 | — | Baïda |
| "Abdel Kader (Live à Bercy)" (with Rachid Taha and Khaled) | 1998 | 36 | 6 | — | 1,2,3 Soleils |
| "Dis moi…" | 1998 | 5 | 5 | — | Baïda |
| "Comme d'habitude" (avec Taha et Khaled) | 1999 | 40 | 40 | — | 1, 2, 3 Soleils |
| "Baïda" | 1999 | — | 49 | — | Baïda |
| "Lila" | 2000 | — | 27 | — | Samra |
| "La main dans la main" | 2001 | — | 21 | — | Samra |
| "Je veux vivre" | 2003 | 10 | 6 | 71 | Un autre Soleil |
| "Je n'ai que mon cœur" | 2004 | — | 70 | — | Un autre Soleil |
| "Mon Pays" | 2006 | 1 | 1 | 19 | Mundial Corrida |
| "Des enfants" | 2012 | — | — | — | |
| "Rani" (with Mohammed Assaf) | 2017 | — | — | — | |
| "All Day, All Night" (with RedOne) | 2018 | — | — | — | |
