= Rock the Casbah =

1982 single by The Clash

- Picture sleeve for original 1982 single release

Single by the Clash

from the album Combat Rock
- B-side: "Long Time Jerk"
- Released: 11 June 1982
- Genre: New wave; dance-punk
- Length: 3:42; 6:35 (extended version)
- Label: CBS; Epic
- Songwriters: Topper Headon, Joe Strummer, Mick Jones
- Producer: The Clash

The Clash singles chronology
"Know Your Rights" (1982)	"Rock the Casbah" (1982)	"Should I Stay or Should I Go" / "Straight to Hell" (1982)

The Clash reissued singles chronology
"Should I Stay or Should I Go" (re-release) (1991)	"Rock the Casbah" (re-release) (1991)	"London Calling" (2nd re-release) (1991)

Music video
- "Rock the Casbah" on YouTube

"Rock the Casbah" is a song by the English punk rock band the Clash, released on 11 June 1982 as the second single from their fifth studio album, Combat Rock (1982). It reached number eight on the Billboard Hot 100 chart in the United States (their only top 10 single in that country) and, along with the track "Mustapha Dance", it also reached number eight on the dance chart.

== Recording ==
The music for "Rock the Casbah" was composed by the band's drummer Topper Headon, based on a piano part that he had been toying with. Finding himself in the studio without his three bandmates, Headon progressively taped the drum, piano and bass parts, recording the bulk of the song's musical instrumentation himself.

This origin makes "Rock the Casbah" different from the majority of Clash songs, which tended to originate with music written by the Joe Strummer–Mick Jones songwriting partnership. Upon entering the studio to hear Headon's recording, the other Clash members were impressed with his creation, stating that they felt the instrumental track was essentially complete. From this point, relatively minor overdubs were added, such as guitars and percussion.

However, Strummer was not impressed by the page of suggested lyrics that Headon gave him. According to Clash guitar technician Digby Cleaver, they were "a soppy set of lyrics about how much he missed his girlfriend". "Strummer just took one look at these words and said, 'How incredibly interesting!', screwed the piece of paper into a ball and chucked it backwards over his head."

Strummer had been developing a set of lyrical ideas that he was looking to match with an appropriate tune. Before hearing Headon's music, Strummer had already come up with the phrases "rock the casbah" and "you'll have to let that raga drop", as lyrical ideas that he was considering for future songs. After hearing Headon's music, Strummer went into the studio's bathroom and wrote lyrics to match the song's melody.

The version of the song on Combat Rock, as well as many other Clash compilations, features an electronic sound effect beginning at the 1:52-minute point of the song. This noise is a monophonic version of the song "Dixie". The sound effect source was generated by the alarm from a digital wristwatch that Mick Jones owned, and was intentionally added to the recording by him.

Algerian rock singer Rachid Taha believed that an early demo tape of his, which he gave to the Clash in 1981, helped inspire the original song.

== Lyrics ==
The song gives a fabulist account of a ban on Western rock music by a West Asian or North African king. The lyrics describe the king's efforts to enforce and justify the ban, and the populace's protests against it by holding rock concerts in temples and squares ("rocking the casbah"). This culminates in the king ordering his military's fighter jets to bomb the protesters; however, after taking off, the pilots ignore his orders and instead play rock music on their cockpit radios, joining the protest and implying the loss of the king's power.

The events depicted in the song are similar to an actual ban on Western music, including rock music, enforced in Iran since the Iranian Revolution. Although classical music and public concerts were permitted during the 1980s and 1990s, the ban was reinstated in 2005, and has remained enforced. Western music is still distributed in Iran through black markets, and Iranian rock music artists are forced to record in secret, under threat of arrest.

The song's lyrics feature various Arabic, Hebrew, Turkish, and Sanskrit loan-words, such as "sharif", "bedouin", "sheikh", "kosher", "rāga", "muezzin", "minaret", and "casbah". Joe Strummer had been toying with the phrase "rock the casbah" prior to hearing Topper Headon's musical track that would form the basis of the song. This phrase had originated during a jam session with Strummer's violinist friend Tymon Dogg. Dogg began playing Eastern scales with his violin, and Strummer started shouting "rock the casbah!" Not hearing Strummer properly, Dogg thought that Strummer had been shouting at him to "stop, you cadger!"

Further inspiration for the lyrics of "Rock the Casbah" originated from Strummer observing the band's manager Bernie Rhodes moaning about the Clash's increasing tendency to perform lengthy songs. Rhodes asked the band facetiously "does everything have to be as long as this rāga?" (referring to the Indian musical style known for its length and complexity). Strummer later returned to his room at the Iroquois Hotel in New York City and wrote the opening lines to the song: "The King told the boogie-men 'you have to let that rāga drop.'"

== Single ==
The single does not contain the album version of the song. Rather, it features a remix by Mick Jones and Bob Clearmountain with a "murkier" sound, more pronounced guitar and piano, more prominent sound effects, and the toy synth sound of the third verse turned down.

=== Single issues ===
The single has several issues, all with different cover, format and B-side (see the table below).

Year
B-side
Format
Label
Country
Note
1982
"Rock the Casbah"
45 rpm 7" vinyl
Epic 34-03245
CAN/USA
Promo
1982
"Mustapha Dance"
45 rpm 12" vinyl
CBS/Sony Records Inc. 07.5P-191
JP
—
1982
"Mustapha Dance"
33 1/3 rpm 12" vinyl
Epic 49-03144
USA
—
1982
"Mustapha Dance"
33 1/3 rpm 12" vinyl
Epic 49-03144
CAN
—
1982
"Mustapha Dance"
45 rpm 7" vinyl
CBS A112479
UK
Picture disc
1982
"Red Angel Dragnet"
45 rpm 7" vinyl
Epic 34-03245
CAN
—
1982
"Long Time Jerk"
45 rpm 7" vinyl
Epic 34-03245
USA
In blue Epic generic die cut sleeve
1982
"Mustapha Dance"
45 rpm 12" vinyl
CBS A 13–2479
UK
—
1982
"Long Time Jerk"
45 rpm 7" vinyl
Epic 15-05540
USA
—
1991
"Mustapha Dance"
45 rpm 7" vinyl
Columbia 656814-7
UK
Reissue
1991
1. "Mustapha Dance"
2. "The Magnificent Dance"
45 rpm 12" vinyl
Columbia 656814-6
UK
—
1991
1. "Mustapha Dance"
2. "The Magnificent Dance"
CD
Columbia 656814-2
UK
—

== Music video ==
The music video for "Rock the Casbah" was filmed in Austin, Texas, by director Don Letts on 8 and 9 June 1982. It intermixes footage of the Clash (with Terry Chimes on the drums) miming a performance of the song, with a storyline depicting two characters travelling together throughout Texas. The video depicts a Muslim hitchhiker (played by actor Titos Menchaca) and a Hasidic Jewish limo driver (Dennis Razze) befriending each other on the road and skanking together through the streets to a Clash concert at Austin's City Coliseum. Throughout the video, an armadillo appears at points. At one point they are seen eating hamburgers in front of a Burger King restaurant. At another point, the Muslim character is seen drinking a beer; Letts stated that all that imagery was "about breaking taboos".

The Clash is shown miming a performance of the song in front of a pumpjack in a Texas oil field. For most of the video clip, guitarist Mick Jones's face is obscured by a veiled camouflage hat. The reason for this is that Jones was in a bad mood during the film shoot. Jones' face remains hidden until the final 30 seconds of the clip, when Strummer pulls the hat off at the "he thinks it's not kosher!" line.

Topper Headon left the band because of a drug problem before the song was released at the beginning of the band's Combat Rock tour, and was replaced by Terry Chimes, who appears in the "Rock the Casbah" video. Headon was extensively interviewed for the Joe Strummer: The Future Is Unwritten documentary film about the late Clash frontman, which was released in 2007. Headon related his experiences during this period, how he became addicted to heroin and how there were problems before his dismissal.

== Legacy ==
The song was chosen by Armed Forces Radio to be the first song broadcast on the service covering the area during Operation Desert Storm. In the 2007 documentary Joe Strummer: The Future Is Unwritten, a friend states that Strummer wept when he heard that the phrase "Rock the Casbah" had been written on an American bomb that was to be detonated on Iraq during the 1991 Gulf War.

Following the 11 September 2001 terrorist attacks, the song was placed on the list of post-9/11 inappropriate titles distributed by Clear Channel. In 2006, the conservative National Review released their list of the top 50 "Conservative Rock Songs", with "Rock the Casbah" at number 20, noting the Clear Channel list as well as frequent requests to the British Forces Broadcasting Service during the Iraq War. Cultural reviewer and political analyst Charlie Pierce commented that "the notion of the Clash as spokesfolk for adventurism in the Middle East might have been enough to bring Joe Strummer back from the dead."

Vulture writer Bill Wyman in 2017 ranked the song number ten of all the band's 139 songs, calling it "one of the greatest rock singles of all time." Wyman further wrote, "Like other Clash songs, this song requires some historical context" about Iran, starting from the 1953 coup d'état—which overthrew the prime minister Mohammad Mosaddegh—to the Islamic Revolution of 1979, which resulted in overthrowing the rule of Mohammad Reza Pahlavi, king of the Imperial State of Iran, and the hostage crisis at the U.S. embassy in Tehran, rupturing Iran–U.S. diplomatic relations—followed by Jimmy Carter, who was criticised for the way he handled the hostage crisis, losing the 1980 U.S. presidential election to Ronald Reagan.

== Cover versions ==
Algerian musician Rachid Taha covered the song (in Algerian Arabic, with the English-language chorus) on his 2004 album Tékitoi. On 27 November 2005 at the Astoria, London, during the Stop the War Coalition Benefit Concert, "...for the night's grandstanding conclusion, the Clash legend Mick Jones strides on in a skinny black suit and plays probably the most exciting guitar he has delivered in years. He and the band are brilliant on Taha's definitive take on "Rock the Casbah", for which the audience goes berserk." They again played Taha's version of the song, "Rock el Casbah", in February 2006, at the France 4 TV show Taratatà. In 2007 at the Barbican, ".... The band were later joined by special guest Mick Jones from the Clash who performed on "Rock El Casbah" and then stayed on stage for the remainder of the show."

== Charts ==
=== Weekly charts ===
Chart (1982–1983)	Peak position
Australia (Kent Music Report)	3
Canada Top Singles (RPM)	17
Netherlands (Dutch Top 40)	21
Netherlands (Single Top 100)	21
New Zealand (Recorded Music NZ)	4
Sweden (Sverigetopplistan)	16
UK Singles (Official Charts)	30
US Billboard Hot 100	8
US Hot Dance Club Play (Billboard)	8
US Top Tracks (Billboard)	6
US Cash Box Top 100	13

Chart (1991)	Peak position
Belgium (Ultratop 50 Flanders)	22
Ireland (IRMA)	10
UK Singles (Official Charts)	15
UK Airplay (Music Week)	16

=== Year-end charts ===
Chart (1982)	Rank
Australia (Kent Music Report)	41

Chart (1983)	Rank
New Zealand (Recorded Music NZ)	34
US Billboard Hot 100	52
US Cash Box Top 100	83

== Certifications ==
Region	Certification	Certified units/sales
Italy (FIMI)	Gold	25,000^{‡}
New Zealand (RMNZ)	2× Platinum	60,000^{‡}
United Kingdom (BPI)	Platinum	600,000^{‡}
United States (RIAA)	2× Platinum	2,000,000^{‡}
^{‡} Sales+streaming figures based on certification alone.

== Personnel ==
- Joe Strummer – vocals, guitar
- Mick Jones – guitar, vocals, sound effects
- Paul Simonon – backing vocals
- Topper Headon – drums, piano, bass guitar
