= Jeanne Added =

French singer-songwriter (born 1980)

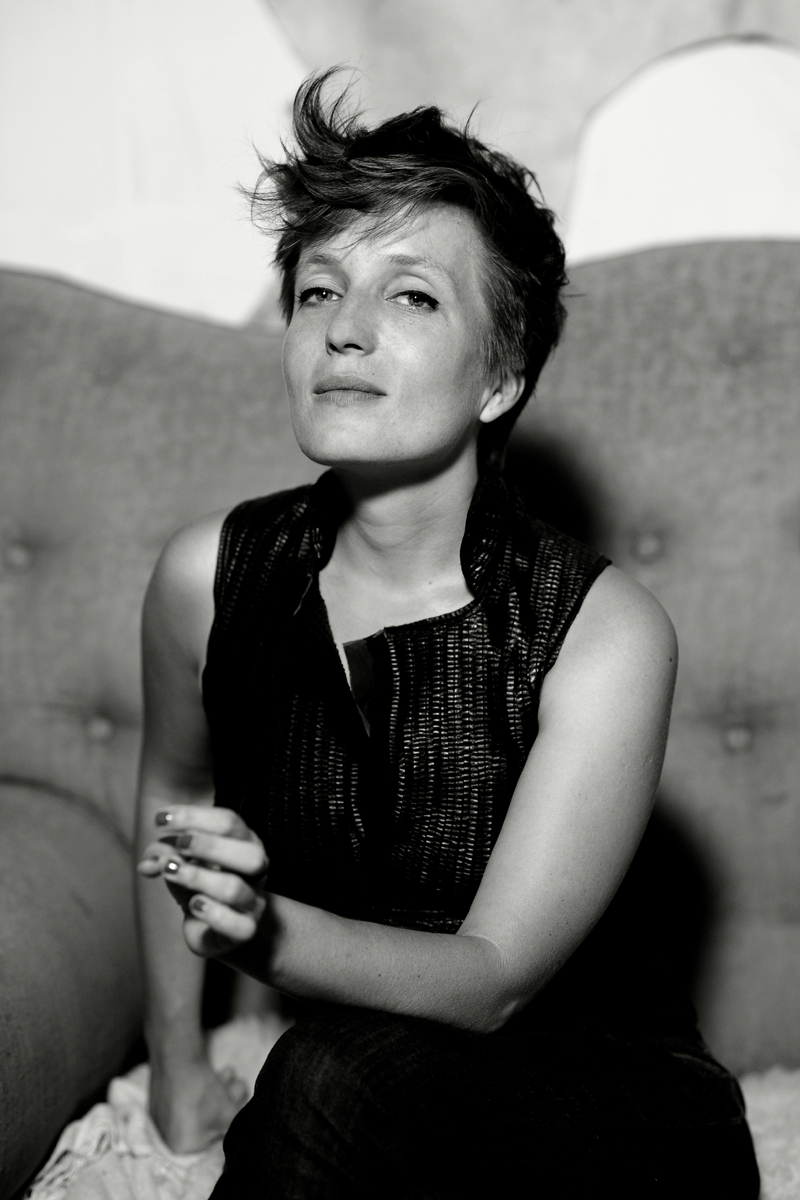
- Jeanne Added, 2012.

Background information
- Born: 25 September 1980 (age 45); Reims, France
- Genres: Jazz, pop rock, rock indépendant, electronica
- Occupation(s): Singer, songwriter
- Years active: 2011–present
- Labels: Naïve
- Website: jeanneadded.com

Jeanne Added (born 25 September 1980 in Reims) is a French singer songwriter singing mainly in English. After starting as a jazz interpreter with various musicians, she launched her solo EP EP#1 in 2011 followed by an independent album Yes is a Pleasant Country also in 2011. She has released three albums and three EPs and a number of singles.

She was nominated for Album Revelation of the year category during Victoires de la musique for her debut album Be Sensational. Jeanne Added won the award of Best Female Artist during Victoires de la musique in 2019 and her album Radiate won Best Rock Album during the same event.

== Discography ==
=== Albums ===
Year	Title	Peak positions		
Year	Title	FRA	BEL (Wa)	SWI
2011	Yes is a Pleasant Country	–	–	–
2015	Be Sensational	35	87	–
2019	Radiate	18	61	53
2022	By Your Side	39	–	–

=== EPs ===
- 2011: EP#1
- 2015: EP
- 2019: Radiate (Alternative Takes)
- 2022: Au Revoir

=== Singles ===
Year	Title	Peak positions		Album
Year	Title	FRA	BEL (Wa)	Album
2015	"A War Is Coming"	163	40 (Ultratip*)	Be Sensational
2015	"Look At Them"	29	–	Be Sensational

*Did not appear in the official Belgian Ultratop 50 charts, but rather in the bubbling under Ultratip charts.
