= Carte de Séjour =

French musical band

- Origin: Lyon, France
- Genres: rock, raï, punk rock
- Years active: 1980–1990
- Labels: Mosquito, Barclay
- Past members: Rachid Taha, Djamel Dif, Mokhtar Amini, Mohamed Amini, Éric Vaquer, Jérôme Savy

Carte de Séjour (French pronunciation: [kaʁt də seʒuʁ], lit. 'residence permit' or 'residence card') was a French rock band composed of Rachid Taha (vocals), Mohamed Amini (guitar), Moktar Amini (bass), and Jérôme Savy (lead guitar).

== History ==
Carte de Séjour was founded in 1980 by Rachid Taha, Djamel Dif, Mokhtar Amini, Mohamed Amini and Éric Vaquer (guitar). Jérôme Savy, former guitarist of the French garage rock band Arsenic, replaced Vaquer some time later. The band's name was a reference to the residence card carried by immigrants in France.

After a major concert at the Palais des sports and performance at Place de la Bastille during the Marche des beurs, the band gained prominence with their rendition of Charles Trenet's Douce France. Carte de Séjour's cover of the well-known song played an important role in raising questions about the status of the Beurs and other descendants of postcolonial immigrants in France, as well as the struggle against mounting right-wing and racist policies of Front national in France.

The group included in its repertoire pop, rock, punk rock, traditional Arab music and gnawa music.

The band split in 1990, after personnel changes and internal strife. Rachid Taha established a solo career and was considered one of the major singers of raï.

== Members of the group ==
- Rachid Taha – lead vocals and composition (d. 2018)
- Djamel Dif – drums and composition on the first maxi single (except for "Halouf Nar")
- Mokhtar Amini – bass guitar, arrangements, composition
- Jérôme Savy – guitars, composition, arrangements replacing Éric Vaquer after he quit in May 1982
- Mohamed Amini – guitars, composition, arrangements

== Discography ==
- 1982: Carte de séjour (maxi 45 rpm)
- 1983 Carte De Séjour
- 1984 Bleu De Marseille
- 1984 Rhorhomanie
- 1986 Douce France
- 1986 2½ (Deux Et Demi)
- 1987 Ramsa
- 1987 Ramsa (Cinq)
