= Ya Rayah =

1997 single by Rachid Taha

"Ya Rayah /يا رايح"

Single by Rachid Taha

from the album Carte Blanche
- B-side: "Jungle Fiction"
- Released: 26 August 1997
- Genre: Algerian chaâbi
- Length: 6:13
- Label: Barclay, PolyGram
- Songwriter: Dahmane El Harrachi
- Producer: Steve Hillage

Rachid Taha singles chronology
"Kelma" (1996)	"Ya Rayah /يا رايح" (1997)	"Ida" (1998)

Music video
- "Ya Rayah" on YouTube

"Ya Rayah" (Arabic: يا رايح, romanized: Yâ râyiḥ, lit. 'you, the one leaving') is an Algerian chaâbi song written and performed in 1973 by Dahmane El Harrachi (Amrani Abderrahmane). Up until the past 15 years this song was known to be Dahman El Harrachi's original song and in the Chaâbi/Andalous tradition of Algiers. This song is a ballad of the traveler, the exiled, the longing to come back, the immigrant, the "wanderin' star", etc. hence its universal appeal.

In 1993, it was performed by French-Algerian singer Rachid Taha on his second self-titled album.

The song was released as a single from the compilation album Carte Blanche (1997) and was later also included on the album Diwân (1998). In September 1998, Taha performed the song live with fellow Algerian singers Khaled and Faudel at the Palais omnisports de Paris-Bercy in Paris, France. Their version was induced on the live album 1,2,3 Soleils the following year.

Taha released the song as a single in August 1997 and reached number eleven on the French singles chart. In February 1998, the song was certified silver in France.

In 2003, Taha performed it as a duo with Enrico Macias at the Olympia in Paris.

After the death of Rachid Taha, the song re-entered the French Singles Chart reaching the Top 20.

== Track listing ==
CD single: 573-890-2; Released 26 August 1997
No.	Title	Length
1.	"Ya Rayah"	6:13
2.	"Jungle Fiction"	4:01

== Charts ==
Chart (1997)	Peak position
French Singles Chart	11

Chart (2018)	Peak position
French Singles Chart	14

== Covers ==
There have been also multiple renditions of Ya Rayah by different artists in different languages including Hebrew, Hindi, Turkish, Greek ("Ki an se thelo" by George Dalaras), Russian ( "Ya Rayah" by Dobranotch) and Serbian ("Jako, jako slabo srce zavodiš" by Zdravko Čolić).

In the year 2010, the song was covered as part of an Israeli rap compilation album, TACT. The song's beat was sampled and used in the song Belyby by Booksills, which featured Shlome Shabat.

In January 2012, it was covered again by the Algerian singer Amel Bouchoucha (Fady Bitar & The AB Brothers), using African dance beats and Berber sounds, bringing the song closer to its roots.

The tune of this song was used by Sanjeev Darshan in the Bollywood movie Mann (1999) for the song "Kali Nagin Ke Jaisi" sung by Udit Narayan and Kavita Krishnamurthy.

In 2016 a French artist, John Mamann, released a song J’suis Comme Toi (Ya Rayah) in collaboration with Lartiste and Rim’K which is an interpolation of the original.

== In popular culture ==
The song was featured during the RAG-TELA fashion show scene in the Colombian telenovela Yo soy Betty, la fea (episode 54, "La bandida de anoche," of the 335-episode streaming release, corresponding to episode 24, "Desfile de problemas," of the original 156-episode broadcast).
