= Rachid Taha =

Algerian singer (1958–2018)

Rachid Taha رشيد طه
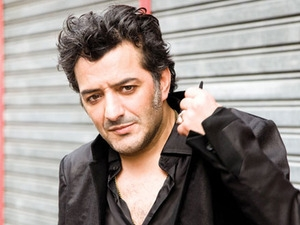
- Taha in 2011

Background information
- Born: 18 September 1958; Sig or Oran, French Algeria
- Died: 12 September 2018 (aged 59) Les Lilas, Île-de-France, France
- Genres: World; rock; raï; Algerian chaabi
- Occupations: Singer-songwriter; activist
- Years active: 1980–2018
- Labels: Knitting Factory; Island; Barclay
- Website: rachidtahaofficial.com

Rachid Taha (Arabic: رشيد طه, Rashīd Ṭāhā, [raʃiːd tˤaːhaː]; 18 September 1958 – 12 September 2018) was an Algerian singer and activist based in France described as "sonically adventurous". His music was influenced by many different styles including rock, electronic, punk and raï.

== Early life ==
Taha was born on 18 September 1958 in Sig, Mascara Province, Algeria, although a second source suggests he was born in the Algerian seacoast city of Oran. This town was the "birthplace of raï" music, and 1958 was a key year in the Algerian struggle for independence against French authority. He began listening to Algerian music in the 1960s, including street-style music called chaabi. Additionally, music from the Maghreb region was part of his upbringing.

He moved with his parents to France when he was ten years old, settling in an immigrant community around the French city of Lyon in 1968. His father was a textile factory worker, with long hours and low pay, such that his life was compared to that of a "modern slave", according to one account. Aged 17, Taha worked during the day at a central heating plant, described as a "menial job", and hated this work, but at night worked as a club DJ playing Arabic music, rap, salsa, funk and "anything else that took his fancy."

In the late 1970s, Taha founded the nightclub called The Rejects or, in French, Les Refoulés, where he would spin mashups of Arabic pop classics over Led Zeppelin, Bo Diddley and Kraftwerk backbeats.

== Career ==
=== Raï roots ===
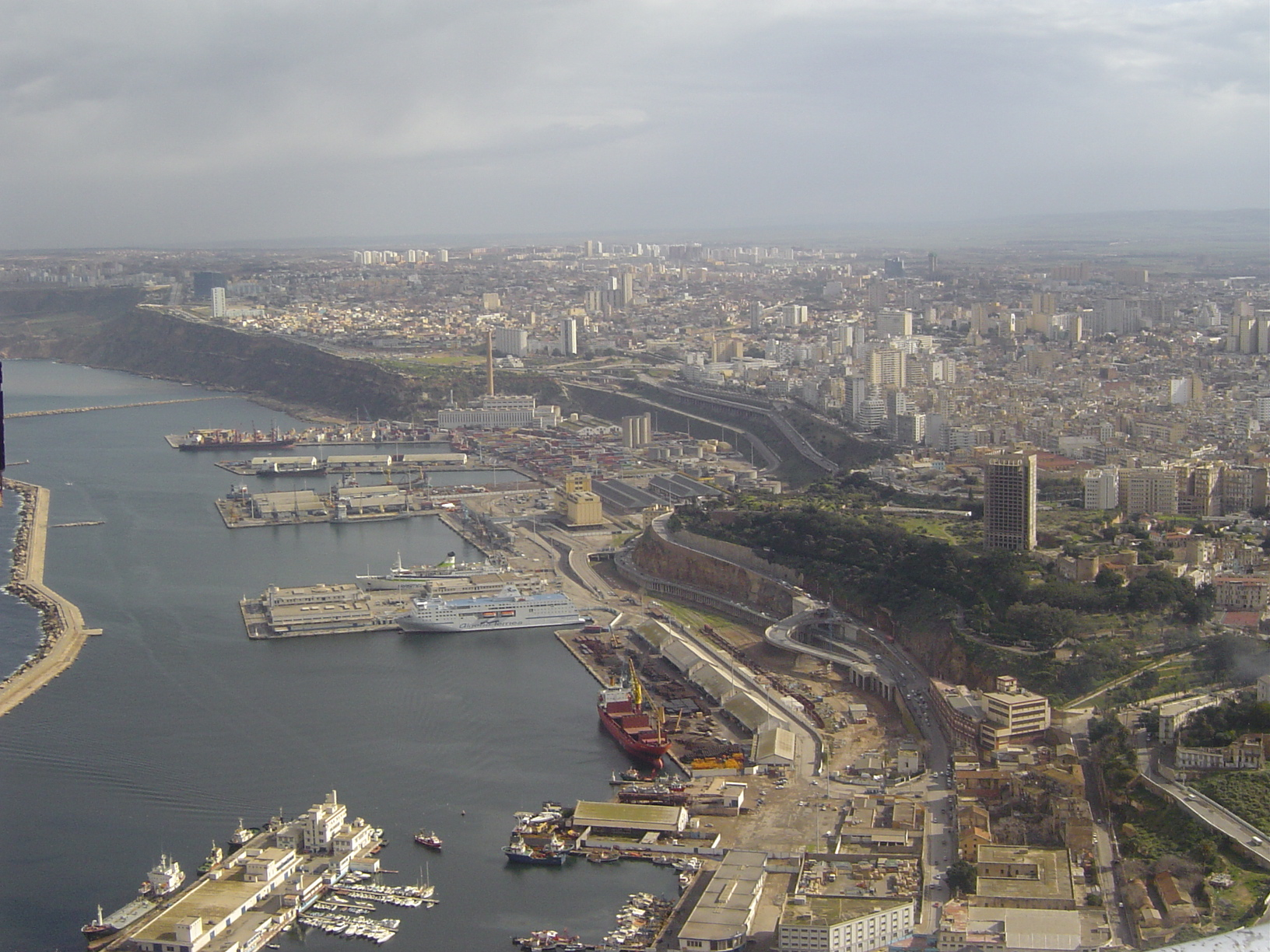
Taha grew up in the seaside Algerian city of Oran.

In the 1980s, Algeria's indigenous pop music known as raï began to achieve international attention. Originally raï music was based on "city slickers adapting music from the sticks" and was described as ribald, but it became more of a medium for political protest when young people in the 1960s and 1970s used it to "express their anger and desires." Taha suggested that Algerian musical styles and rock are "closely linked". Taha was influenced by the Moroccan chaâbi band Nass El Ghiwane which has been described as "Morocco's answer to the Beatles or the Stones."

=== Carte de Séjour ===
In 1981, while living in Lyon, Taha met Mohammed and Mokhtar Amini and the three of them, along with Djamel Dif and Eric Vaquer, would soon form a band. In 1982, Taha was the lead vocalist for the Arab-language rock group which they named Carte de Sejour, meaning Green Card or Residence Permit depending on the translation. He sang in both French and Arabic, but usually in Arabic. Taha was inspired by the group The Clash:

The Clash were militant and hedonistic in equal measure ... And that was exciting to me. You could be a rebel and be in the biggest rock'n' roll band in the world! It was also clear that they loved music. Joe Strummer had nothing to do with that terrible punk cynicism. By the time of Mogador '81 they weren't just a rock'n'roll band, they were doing hip-hop, reggae, ska, country and western, disco, but making it sound their own. I think that's what gave French musicians the confidence to do the same with whatever music they were into. In some ways, they introduced us to the world. – Rachid Taha, in The Guardian, 2007

Taha met members of the group The Clash in Paris:

It was September 1981, and Taha bumped into all four members of the band just before they were due to play at the Théâtre Mogador in Paris. Taha gave them a copy of a demo tape by his band, Carte de Séjour (Residence Permit), an outfit from Lyon who combined Algerian raï with funk and punk rock. "They looked interested," remembers Taha, "but when they didn't get in touch, I thought nothing of it. Then, a few months later, I heard Rock the Casbah." He cackles mischievously. "Maybe they did hear it after all." The incident has since gone down in French rock legend. – report in The Guardian, 2007

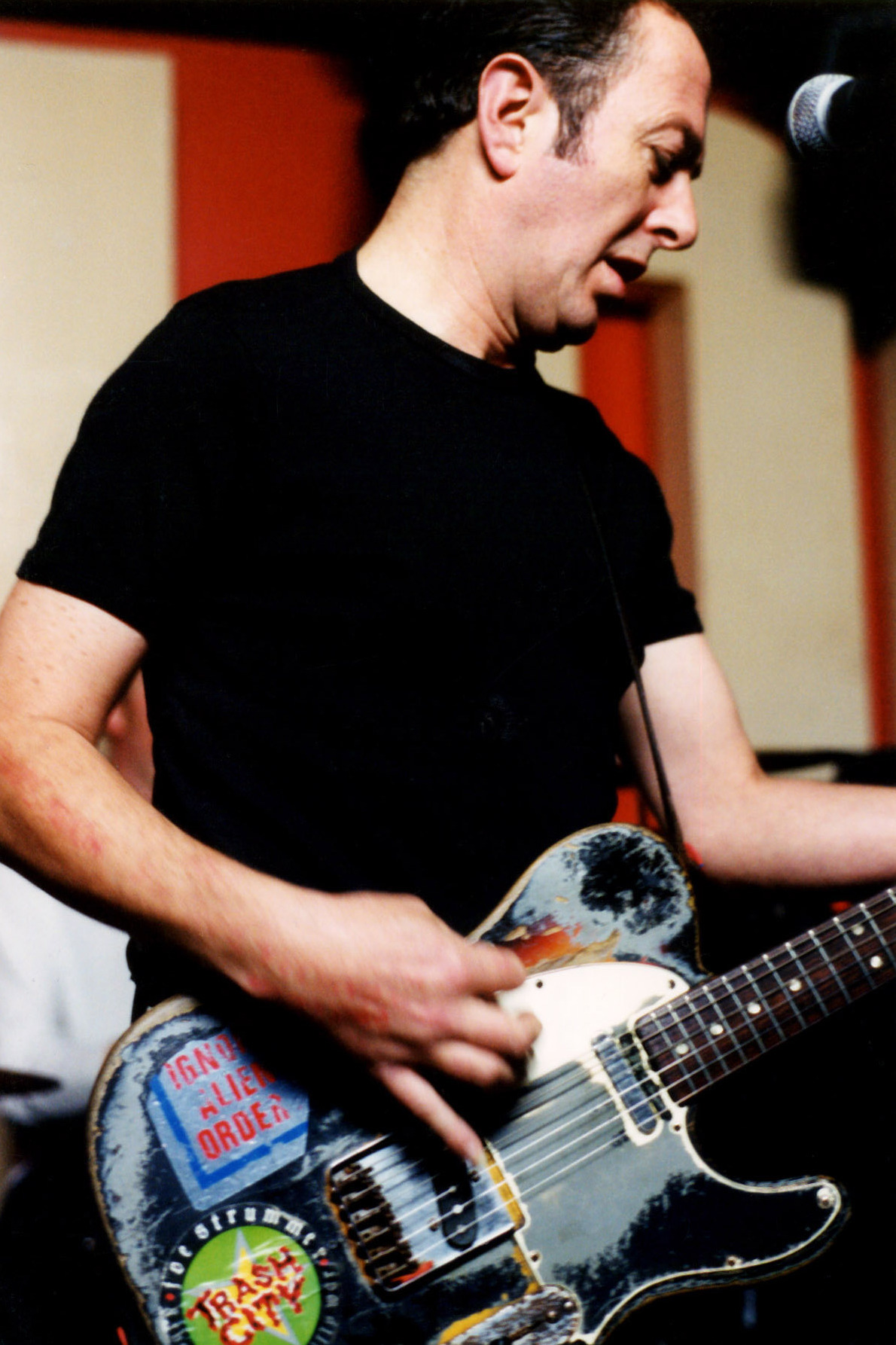
Clash singer Joe Strummer

Taha believed his early recordings helped to inspire The Clash to create the song "Rock the Casbah". A New York Times music reporter wrote of Taha's cover version of the Clash's hit song probably influenced by his earlier work:

Is "Rock El Casbah", with its images of sheiks gusting through the desert in Cadillacs and cracking down on 'degenerate' disco dancers, an indictment of the oil-choked, religiously fanatical Arab world, or a wry comment on the West's cartoonish vision of the region? No listener to the recording can doubt that it is both, or that in Mr. Taha, a rumpled North African with a buzz saw voice, the Clash has an unlikely heir. – Jody Rosen, 2005

These were difficult years since record stores often refused to stock their records "because they didn't want Arabs coming into their shops". There was little money; the band performed in suburbs of Lyon. Taha took a standard patriotic French song entitled "Sweet France" (in French: Douce France) which had originally been recorded by Charles Trenet in the 1940s, kept the lyrics, but sang it with "furious irony" which irritated many French listeners, particularly coming from a "scruffy, bohemian-looking Arabic singer", to the point where Taha's version was banned from French radio. The "acerbic" song created a "splash", nevertheless, and won Taha some recognition as a serious artist. The group never achieved much commercial success and, as a result, Taha had to work a series of day jobs in a factory, then as a house painter, a dishwasher, and later as an encyclopedia salesman. They recorded their first maxi album Carte De Séjour in 1983. In 1984, with the help of British guitarist Steve Hillage, the group achieved a "sharp, driving sound" which played well on the radio, and the LP was entitled Rhoromanie. In his songwriting, Taha wrote about living in exile and the cultural strife associated with being an Algerian immigrant in France. In 1986, his "sneering punk-rock cover of 'Douce France'" was seen as an "unmistakable protest against the nation's treatment of its immigrant underclass", and caused consternation in French political circles. His song "Voilà, Voilà" protested racism. Taha had to cope with anti-Arab sentiment and confusion; for example, The New York Times stated in a front-page story that Taha was Egyptian rather than Algerian, but later posted a correction. Later, in 2007, Taha-as-an-immigrant was mentioned in France's National Center of the History of Immigration.

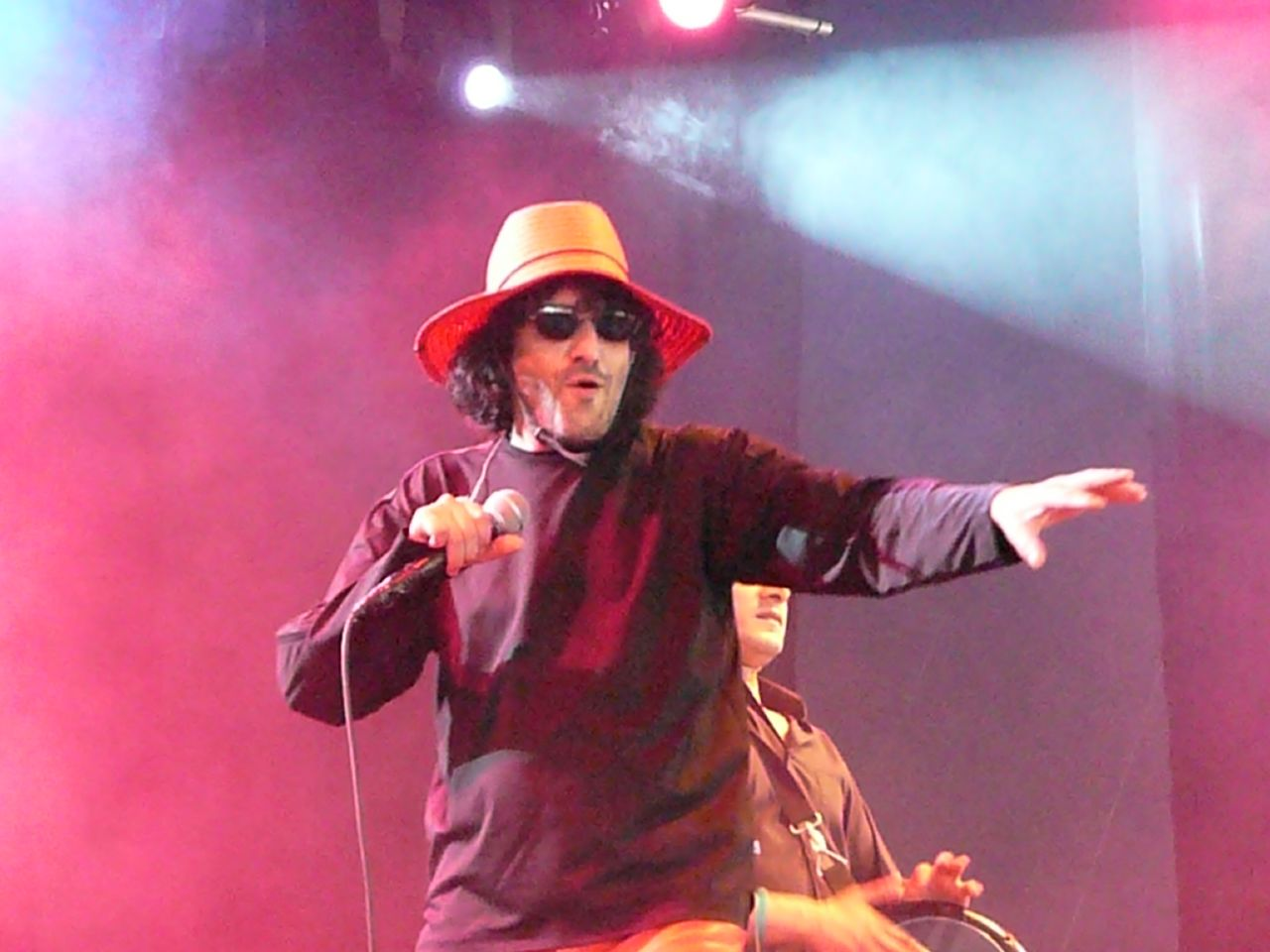
Taha performing in Belgium

When performing live, Taha wore various outfits, including at one point a leather fedora hat, then later a red cowboy hat. The band's second and last LP entitled Ramsa (Five) was released in 1986. The band dissolved in 1989.

=== Solo years ===
In 1989, Taha moved to Paris to launch his solo career. At one point he was invited to Los Angeles to record with musician Don Was, who had been a producer associated with the Rolling Stones. Taha mixed a variety of instruments and styles for his sound. With a drum instrument called a doumbek or darbuka, his new group played Arabic-style beats. It appeared at one point that Taha might become an "overnight success", but after the release of the album Barbès, sales were disappointing in the United States, possibly because Americans were not keen on Arabic-sounding music during the time of the first Gulf War.

In 1993, Taha again worked with Hillage who helped produce his second solo album, the self-titled Rachid Taha and helped him achieve "the kind of clubland-raï synthesis". Hillage worked on nine solo Taha albums from 1993 to 2006, helping Taha return to his "north African roots". In 1995, he released the album entitled Olé Olé with Taha looking like an "Aryan androgyne" with dyed blond hair and blue contact lenses, to make a point about anti-Arab bigotry and at the "homophobia of North African culture." Valencia features the singing of Kirsty Hawkshaw. In 1997, his song "Ya Rayah" became a hit. He performed in the Canary Islands.

In 2001, Taha released Made in Medina, and a music critic commented that he used a "full and varied instrumental palette" along with "a dizzying vocal facility that transcends whatever style he's plugged." The album was recorded in Paris, New Orleans, and London with input from the American jam band Galactic. Taha saw parallels between African and American music and said "New Orleans is like Algiers ... They were both French colonies at one time, and there's even an area there called Algiers," and he noted that Louisiana Zydeco drum patterns were similar to raï music. Made in Medina combined Algerian roots, techno, pop music, and early rock and punk influences with "remarkable consistency" with previous works, according to Hillage. There were elements of political protest in his music leading a BBC critic to describe him as a "shit-disturbing artist who risks challenging his own culture as undemocratic." A report in The Guardian suggested that Taha had achieved a cult status in pop music.

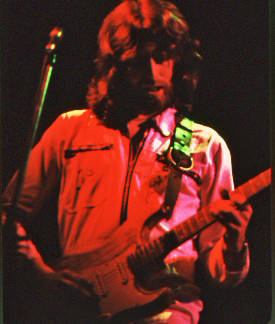
Guitarist Steve Hillage played a big role in Taha's career, primarily as a producer.

Taha's breakthrough album as a solo artist was his bestseller Diwân, featuring remakes of songs from Algerian and Arab traditions. The album featured traditional instruments like the oud but with a "contemporary veneer of programmed percussion and samples added in." Taha mixed the oud with strings using a contemporary beat along with guitar work, according to one account. Taha's album Tékitoi, produced by Steve Hillage and released in 2004, brought acclaim and recognition from other rock musicians. The title track is "street slang" meaning, roughly, Who the Hell Are You? (from the French Tu es qui, toi ? shortened into T'es qui, toi ?) and the music had "echoes of Joe Strummer", according to a review in The Observer. In 2005 Taha performed with Robert Plant, Patti Smith and Brian Eno. He covered The Clash song "Rock the Casbah" which he retitled with the Arabic name of "Rock El Casbah". This song appeared in the 2007 film about Clash frontman Joe Strummer entitled The Future Is Unwritten. The song suggested rock music as "banned but unstoppable". Taha performed the song along with The Clash musician Mick Jones. The Guardian selected "Rock El Casbah" as one of the top 50 cover songs.

Taha played in Morocco in 2006. In 2007, Taha performed in Canada and a reporter from the Montreal Gazette described his performance while wearing a "pewter pimp suit" which was "stunning":

Rachid Taha did not disappoint. ... Taha leaned into his cheerfully louche street persona. Taha dropped his hat on the mic stand. The percussion undulated in, the trumpet and keys re-creating a North African swirl. Ste. Catherine St. was a sea of clapping hands. Some fans tried to get an Algerian flag waving and abandoned it to dance. Taha brought the crowd down and then back up for coute-moi camarade, an irresistible bounce about female treachery from the Diwan 2 album. But given there is always a subtext to Taha's music, the girls in the casbah danced to the blocked trumpet. Then Taha fell on his ass. – Montreal Gazette, 2007

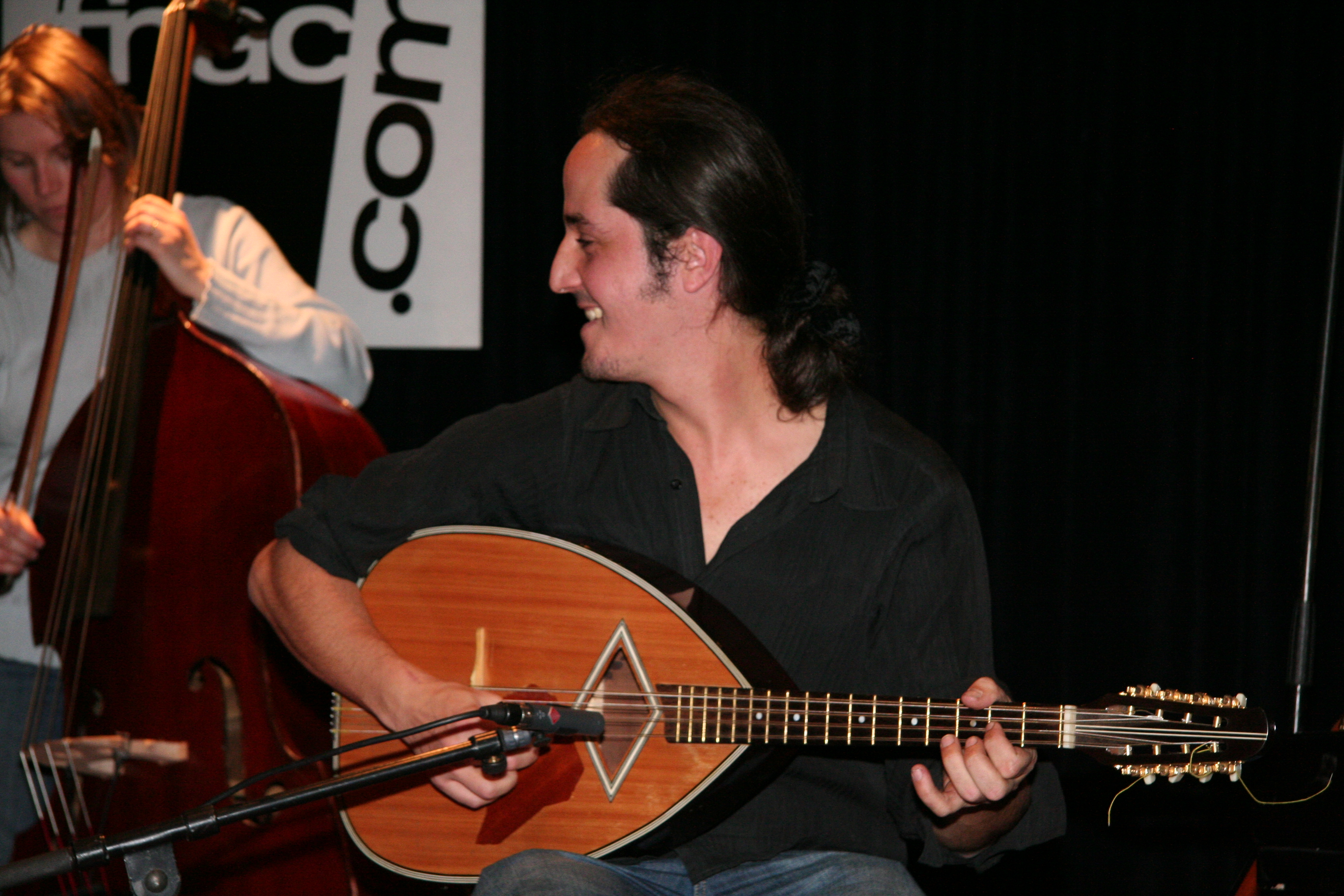
An Algerian mandole or mandolute, played by a member of Mon côté punk.

In 2008 he performed with the band Dengue Fever. He was described as a ""wild Algerian punk fan" performing among a lineup which read like a "Who's Who of West African music", and was part of "Africa Express", a response to the lack of African musicians at Bob Geldof's Live 8 musical extravaganza.

In 2008, Taha was growing increasingly prominent, with greater audiences in places such as Canada, although there were reports that his music had "trouble getting airplay" in France. He performed with Nigerian artists Femi Kuti and Seun Kuti in Lagos at a "Felabration" of the music of their late father Fela Kuti, as well as with Brian Eno in an anti-war concert in London.

In 2009, Taha released Bonjour which The Guardian music critic Robin Denselow described as "calmed down" under a new producer, Gaëtan Roussel. Denselow wrote: "The result is an unlikely set in which Taha appears to be deliberately courting a new, wider market by playing down that wild rebel image." Denselow felt the music was more "commercial" and "not his most exciting." It included a "rousing tribute" on his cover song Rock El Casbah to the late Clash guitarist Joe Strummer. In 2010, Taha played in Toronto, Canada to large audiences. Taha performed with Algerian artist Mehdi Haddab who plays the oud. Taha's song "Habina" was featured in the 2010 film, It's Kind of a Funny Story. Guitarist Carlos Santana recorded his song Migra which went on to sell over 25 million copies. In recent years, Taha toured nations including the United States and Dubai.

In 2013 Taha released the Zoom album, which was produced by guitarist Justin Adams and featured guests Mick Jones and Brian Eno;. Jones toured with Taha as part of the Zoom project. The album included a new recording of "Voilà, Voilà". Taha also recorded "Now or Never" (words and music by Aaron Schroeder / Wally Gold and previously recorded by Elvis Presley), which features Jeanne Added singing in English.

=== Use of Taha's songs in movies and computer games ===
The song '"Barra Barra'" from his album Made in Medina was featured in the 2001 film Black Hawk Down as well as in the Games Convention 2008 trailer of the game Far Cry 2. It was also featured in the 2007 film The Hunting Party.

His song "Garab" from Made in Medina was used in the movie The Truth About Charlie in 2002, and also in Blood and Chocolate in 2007.

His song "Ya Rayah" from his album Carte Blanche was used in the 2006 movie Something New.

"Ya Rayah" was also allegedly plagiarized by the composer duo Sanjeev–Darshan for their song "Kali Nagin Ke Jaisi" in the soundtrack of the Bollywood film Mann (transl. The Psyche).

=== Reviews ===
Some critics attribute Taha's unique sound to his use of the mandolute, a mixture of the traditional oud with European fretted instruments. One critic described his arrangements as "no less bombastic" since they mixed North African rhythms and "string orchestra flourishes" with "pummeling big-beat techno, distorted electric guitars, snatches of Bo Diddley, Led Zeppelin and other macho sounds."

- Music critic Philip Brasor in Japan Times commented that Taha's album Made in Medina featured Arabic "chanting" which was meant to evoke "the generalized chaos of society" and which features "heart-stopping break beats, flamenco guitar, African choruses, crunching hard rock and the inevitable sappy love song."
- Music critic Danny Wiser praised Taha for both his emphasis that he places upon fellow Arabs in North Africa to have pride in both parts of their dual-identity as Arabs as well as Africans, in addition to complimenting him for his infectious personality that shines through on his posthumous album, Je Suis Africain, commenting that "one can almost hear his smile beginning to shine through as he plays; simply through the tone of his voice one can detect that he seems to really enjoy performing his music."
- Music critic Robin Denselow felt Taha's Bonjour album was calm – "he switches between Arabic and French in this mix of pleasant ballads and novelty pop, with just the occasional reminder of the old passion and anger." Denselow felt his album Tékitoi (2004) was his "most powerful, direct fusion of rock and North African styles to date." Denselow wrote:

Taha's blend of anger and angst has been distilled into a set of songs that match crunching guitar chords, simple riffs and angry lyrics (in French and Arabic) with subtle, wailing flourishes of North African embellishment. – Robin Denselow, The Guardian, 2007

- The New York Times wrote about Taha's song "Ah Mon Amour":

The thrumming beat in this 21st century Räi piece is ancient and high-tech, showing how gripping a single drum can be, even when we cannot tell whether it is living or looped. The lyrics ricochet back and forth between French and Arabic, and we remember that Räi began in the city of Oran, whose windows are supposed to face away from the sea to gaze only on the desert sand. – Dwight Garner, The New York Times, 2008

- BBC News music critic Martin Vennard described Taha's music as a "seductive mixture of traditional North African, rock, techno and dance music."
- Canadian music critic Philly Markowitz named a Taha album one of the best in 2005.
- French music critic Amobe Mevegue described Taha as an "eclectic artist".

== Personal life and death ==
Taha was described as "gregarious" and "quick with a smile." A person who liked to party throughout the night, he also had a cosmopolitan group of friends. Taha was quoted as saying "I've never wanted to just stay in my own neighborhood, my own community ... It's a kind of conformism. You have to be adventurous."

Taha was not fond of contemporary French cinema and said "I'd much rather watch some dumb Hollywood movie than another haute bourgeois auteurist piece of crap." He was a critic of the Bush administration although he made comments favoring a bombing raid on Iran, and said that "Iran shouldn't be allowed to have nukes."

Taha suffered from Chiari malformation diagnosed in 1987. "I'm tired of people thinking I'm a drunk on stage. While these are the symptoms of Arnold Chiari disease. I'm stumbling because I'm losing my balance. I'm wavering. It generates a disruption in the body."

Taha died from a heart attack in his sleep on 12 September 2018, six days before his 60th birthday. A posthumous album, Je suis Africain, previously finished before his death, was released on September 20, 2019.
