= Best of (Khaled album) =

Greatest hits album by Khaled
- Released: November 2007
- Recorded: 1992—2007
- Genre: Raï
- Length: 1:07:29
- Label: Wrasse Records
- Producers: Don Was; Michael Brook; Steve Hillage; Jean-Jacques Goldman; Clive Hunt; Akhenaton; Imhotep; Philippe Eidel; Khaled; Laurent Guéneau; Tefa; Masta

Khaled chronology
Ya-Rayi (2004)	Best of (2007)	Liberté (2009)

Best of, also referred to as Best of Khaled, is a greatest hits album by Algerian singer-songwriter Khaled. The compilation includes tracks from four of his previous studio albums: Khaled (1992), N'ssi N'ssi (1993), Sahra (1996) and Ya-Rayi (2004). It also included "Abdel Kader" from a live collaborative album with Rachid Taha and Faudel, 1,2,3 Soleils (1998), "Benthi," a collaboration with French singer Melissa M from her debut studio album Avec tout mon amour (2007), plus a two new tracks ("La terre a tremblé" and "Mon premier amour" a collaboration with French singer Lady Laistee).

"Mon premier amour" is a re-recorded of his 1985 song "Hadak Aachki Le Oul" and interpolation and reimagined version of 2000 song "Time for a Change" by the German project The Rapsody, which featured Khalid himself, American rapper MC Lyte and the German duo DaNaCeE.

== Track listing ==
No.	Title	Length
1.	"Didi"	4:58
2.	"Wahrane"	4:25
3.	"Aïcha"	4:19
4.	"Abdel Kader (Live à Bercy, Paris / 1998)" (with Rachid Taha and Faudel)	5:00
5.	"Ouelli El Darek"	3:09
6.	"Oran Marseille" (with IAM)	4:23
7.	"Les ailes"	4:52
8.	"Sahra"	4:09
9.	"Ne m'en voulez pas"	4:55
10.	"N'ssi N'ssi"	3:31
11.	"Ya-Rayi"	3:59
12.	"H'mama"	6:47
13.	"Benthi" (with Melissa M)	4:41
14.	"La Terre a Tremblé"	4:25
15.	"Mon premier amour" (with Lady Laistee)	3:22
Total length:		1:07:29

=== Samples and interpolations ===
- "Mon premier amour" interpolates "Hadak Aachki Le Oul" (1985), written and performed by Khaled himself, and "Time for a Change" (2000), written by Peter Hoff, Khaled, MC Lyte and DaNaCeE performed by The Rapsody featuring Khaled himself, MC Lyte, and DaNaCeE.
