= Ya-Rayi =

Studio album by Khaled
- Released: August 2004 (International); June 27, 2005 (US Edition)
- Recorded: 2004
- Studio: Ferber (Paris); Calm (Paris); Westlake (Hollywood); Plus XXX (Paris); Studio 4 (Paris); World Beat Productions (Calabasas); Fantasy (Berkeley)
- Genre: Raï
- Length: 49:48; 53:57 (US Edition)
- Language: Arabic; French; English (USA)
- Label: Universal; Wrasse
- Producer: Don Was; Jacob Desvarieux; Philippe Eidel; K. C. Porter; Dawn Elder

Khaled chronology
Kenza (1999)	Ya-Rayi (2004)	Best of (2007)

US release cover

Ya-Rayi (Arabic: يا رأيي, meaning My opinion) is his fifth studio album by Khaled, it was first released in Europe in August 2004 by AZ Records, a label of Universal Music France, and later licensed in UK, and then reissued in United States on June 27, 2005. The European release was dubbed a "back to the roots" album, while the United States release was dubbed a "peace through music" album.

The album includes remakes of El Hadj M'Hamed El Anka's "El-H'mam" and Rabah Driassa and Blaoui Houari's "H'mama" and features noted Algerian pianist Maurice El Mediouni on tracks "Mani Hani" and "H'mama" with Don Was producing the title track. In the US edition of the album, it features noted Mexican-American guitarist Carlos Santana and American singer Elan Atias on the track "Love To The People" and this track has two versions, which is English and Arabic.

== Critical reception ==
Professional ratings
Review scores
Source	Rating
Allmusic	4/5 stars

== Track listing ==
Standard edition
No.	Title	Length
1.	"Mani Hani"	3:55
2.	"Ya-Rayi"	3:59
3.	"El-H'Mam"	4:28
4.	"Lemen"	4:06
5.	"Yema Yema"	3:49
6.	"Ya Galbi"	4:30
7.	"H'Mama"	6:47
8.	"Ensa El-Hem"	4:34
9.	"Hagda"	5:06
10.	"El Ghira"	4:33
11.	"El-H'Mam" (Imhotep Remix)	3:55
Total length:		49:48

US edition
No.	Title	Length
1.	"Ya-Rayi"	3:59
2.	"Love to the People (English Version)" (featuring Carlos Santana and Elan Atias)	4:15
3.	"Ya Galbi"	4:31
4.	"H'Mama"	6:47
5.	"Hagda"	5:07
6.	"Yema Yema"	3:50
7.	"Ensa El-Hem"	4:36
8.	"El Ghira"	4:33
9.	"Lemen"	4:07
10.	"Mani Hani"	3:59
11.	"Love to the People (Arabic Version)" (featuring Carlos Santana and Elan Atias)	4:18
12.	"El-H'Mam" (Imhotep Remix)	3:55
Total length:		53:57
