= Hotter than You Know =

Single by Preluders
- Released: 17 May 2004
- Length: 3:08
- Label: Cheyenne; Polydor; Zeitgeist
- Songwriter(s): Michale Graves; Celetia Martin
- Producer(s): Jörn-Uwe Fahrenkrog-Petersen; Gena Wernik

Preluders singles chronology
"Bal privé" (2004)	"Hotter than You Know" (2004)	"Walking on Sunshine" (2004)

"Hotter than You Know" is a song by German girl group Preluders. It was written by Michale Graves and Celetia Martin and produced by Jörn-Uwe Fahrenkrog-Petersen and Gena Wernik. Released by Cheyenne Records as a standalone non-album single in May 2004, following the release of their debut album Girls in the House (2003), it reached number 21 on the German Singles Chart.

== Background ==
"Hotter than You Know" was written by Michale Graves and Celetia Martin and produced by frequent Preluders collaborators, duo Jörn-Uwe Fahrenkrog-Petersen and Gena Wernik. Fahrenkrog-Petersen commented on the recording sessions: "It was crazy to see what big steps they have made since then. They sang this song with 150% strength and passion and you can hear that in the end result. Tertia [Botha]'s addlips are from another planet."

== Music video ==
A music video for "Hotter than You Know" was filmed in Berlin in April 2004. Largely filmed in front of a greenscreen, it references several title sequeneces of the James Bond film series.

== Track listings ==
Maxi single
No.	Title	Writer(s)	Producer(s)	Length
1.	"Hotter than You Know" (Radio Edit)	Michale Graves; Celetia Martin	Jörn-Uwe Fahrenkrog-Petersen; Gena Wernik	3:08
2.	"Hotter than You Know" (Video Edit)	Graves; Martin	Fahrenkrog-Petersen; Wernik	3:28
3.	"Hotter than You Know" (Karaoke)	Graves; Martin	Fahrenkrog-Petersen; Wernik	3:08
4.	"Born to Love You Forever"	Billy Steinberg; Gustav Jonsson; Marcus Sepehrmanesh; Tommy Tysper	Fahrenkrog-Petersen	3:40

== Credits and personnel ==
- Miriam Cani – vocals
- Anh-Thu Doan – vocals
- Jörn-Uwe Fahrenkrog-Petersen – production
- Nik Hafemann – supervising producer
- Jeo – mixing
- Kay Mason – editing
- Rebecca Miro – vocals
- Anne Ross – vocals
- Patricia Sadowski – vocals
- Jörg Sander – guitars
- Gena Wernik – production, mixing

== Charts ==
Chart performance for "Hotter than You Know"
Chart (2004)	Peak position
Austria (Ö3 Austria Top 40)	49
Germany (GfK)	21
Switzerland (Schweizer Hitparade)	53
