= Milk & Honey (German group) =

German musical duo

- Origin: Germany
- Genres: Pop, world music
- Years active: 2006–2010
- Labels: Warner Music Group
- Spinoff of: Preluders
- Members: Anne Ross; Manel Filali

Milk & Honey was a German musical duo composed of Anne Ross and Manel Filali. The duo were formed in 2006 and they signed with Warner to release their debut single "Habibi (Je T'aime)", which was the lead single from their only studio album, Elbi (2008). It was followed by the second single "Didi". Both songs entered the German charts.

== History ==
After leaving her previous group, the pop quintet Preluders, in 2005, Anne Ross was introduced by Jörn-Uwe Fahrenkrog-Petersen to Manel Filali, and so they formed the duo Milk & Honey. They signed with Warner Music Group in 2006 and released the single "Habibi (Je t'aime)"; produced by Bülent Aris and Felix Schönewald, it mixes traditional pop music aspects with elements of oriental music.

In 2007 the duo reached higher prominence after performing at the reality show Popstars and in the German version of Come Dine with Me (entitled Das perfekte Dinner). In the same year, they released their second single, "Didi", a re-imagined version of Khaled's song of the same name; a music video for it premiered at VIVA Germany on 17 August 2007.

In 2008, the duo released their debut studio album, Elbi, through Warner Music Group. Following their hiatus, Manel Filali pursued a solo music career, releasing her debut single "Leche Leche (Anna Anna)" featuring Lafrontino and Don Cali in 2009, which went on to be her only single at that time. She later returned in 2020 with the single "No Easy Way", released under the name MNL.

== Discography ==
=== Studio albums ===
- Elbi (2008)

=== Singles ===
List of singles, showing year released and chart positions
Title	Year	Peak chart positions		Album
Title	Year	GER	AUT	Album
"Habibi (Je T'aime)"	2006	16	46	Elbi
"Didi"	2007	38	–	Elbi
