= 100% Arabica =

100% Arabica may refer to:

- 100% Arabica (coffee), a common blend of coffee and quality labeling
- 100% Arabica (film), a 1997 French comedy movie
