= Même pas fatigué !!! =

"Même pas fatigué!!!"

Single by Magic System and Khaled

from the album Liberté and Raï'n'B Fever, Vol.3: Même pas fatigué !!!
- Language: French; Algerian arabic
- English title: Not even tired!!!
- B-side: "Même pas fatigué !!!" (Djul's Club Remix)
- Released: March 1, 2009
- Recorded: 2009
- Studio: Studio Most (France)
- Genre: Zouglou; raï
- Length: 3:25
- Label: Artop Records; Universal Music France
- Composers: Aurélien Mazin; Djamel Fezari; Bellek; Magic System
- Lyricists: Asalfo Traoré; Khaled Hadj Brahim; Djamel Fezari
- Producer: Kore

Magic System singles chronology
"Zouglou Dance - Joie de vivre" (2008)	"Même pas fatigué!!!" (2009)	"Célébrités" (2010)

Khaled singles chronology
"Henna" (2006)	"Même pas fatigué !!!" (2009)	"C'est la vie" (2012)

Alternative cover

Music video
- "Même pas fatigué !!!" on YouTube

"Même pas fatigué !!!" (transl. Not even tired!!!) is a song by Ivorian band Magic System and Algerian singer Khaled. It was released on 2009 by Universal Music France as the lead single from Khaled's sixth album Liberté on which it is the 18th track, and it also included on Kore's album Raï'n'B Fever: Même pas fatigué !!! on the second disc.

The song stayed at number-one hit for seven non-consecutive weeks in France, becoming Magic System's first topping hit and most successful single in France. It was also much aired on radio.

== Music video ==
A music video was shot being a football game between two amateur teams of celebrities dubbed "Rai'N'B" and "Fever". Rai'N'B wins by 37-34! French footballer Franck Ribéry made a cameo appearance on the music video.

== Track listings ==
CD and digital download

1. "Même pas fatigué !!!" — 3:25
2. "Même pas fatigué !!!" (Djul's Club Remix) — 4:15

== Charts ==
=== Weekly charts ===
Chart (2009)	Peak position
Belgian Singles Chart (Wallonia)	12
European Hot 100 Singles	4
French Digital Singles Chart	2
French Physical Singles Chart	1
Swiss Singles Chart	49

=== Year-end charts ===
Chart (2009)	Position
Belgian Singles Chart (Wallonia)	60
European Hot 100 Singles	27
French Physical Singles Chart	2

== Cover versions ==
In 2011, Greek singer Antonis Remos covered the song titled "Κομμένα Πια Τα Δανεικά" ("Loans are over now") for his studio album Kleista Ta Stomata
