= Let Me Love You (DJ Rebel and Mohombi song) =

Single by DJ Rebel and Mohombi featuring Shaggy
- Released: 1 August 2016
- Recorded: 2016
- Genre: Electro house, EDM, Raï
- Length: 3:33
- Label: United Music Group
- Songwriters: Kevin Leyers; Mohombi; Shaggy
- Producer: DJ Rebel

DJ Rebel singles chronology
"Music" (2015)	"Let Me Love You" (2016)

Mohombi singles chronology
"Animals" (2016)	"Let Me Love You" (2016)	"Se Fue" (2017)

Shaggy singles chronology
"I Got You" (2016)	"Let Me Love You" (2016)	"That Love" (2016)

"Let Me Love You" is a song by Belgian Electro house artist DJ Rebel and Congolese-Swedish singer Mohombi featuring Shaggy. The song comes from his upcoming album. It contains samples of music from the tradition Algerian song "Abdel Kader" sung by Algerian artists Cheb Khaled, Rachid Taha and Faudel. The song was released on 1 August 2016.

== Background ==
"Let Me Love You" contains sampling of an Algerian traditional song, which was taken from an even more famous Algerian Folk song called "Abdel Kader" (1993). DJ Rebel sampled the musical refrain from it into his new single, with new English language lyrics written by Mohombi and Shaggy. Shaggy and Mohombi previously worked together in "I Need Your Love" (2014), credited to Shaggy, Mohombi, Faydee and Costi, a hit that received commercial success.

== Music video ==
The song's music video, directed by Alex Ceausu, was released on 1 August 2016 on DJ Rebel's official Youtube channel. It featured three credited artistis, DJ Rebel, Mohombi and Shaggy alongside numerous models and dancers.Shot in Romania (The Flag is seen), DJ Rebel takes his turntables stuff to the beach, where the party has started. Mohombi performs the song with DJ Rebel in the background while the girls are dancing. In a second verse, Mohombi is shown singing to his love interest. Shaggy appears in the third verse of the video joining the party. The video ends with all dancers around DJ Rebel.

== Track listing ==
Digital download

1. "Let Me Love You" (featuring Mohombi and Shaggy) – 3:33

== Credits ==
- Turntablist, arrangement – DJ Rebel
- Vocals – Mohombi, Shaggy
- Lyrics – Kevin Leyers, Mohombi, Shaggy
- Label: United Music Group

== Release history ==
Region	Date	Format	Label
United States	1 August 2016	CD; digital download	United Music Group
