= Le Jour (disambiguation) =

Le Jour is French for "The Day". The term may refer to:

== Newspapers ==
- Le Jour, a Quebec newspaper in favour of Quebec independence that existed from 1974 to 1976.
- Le Jour, Belgian daily newspaper (1894-2010), absorbed in 1986 by the L'Avenir media group, fused with Le Courrier de Verviers, renamed in 2010 as L'Avenir Verviers
- Le Jour (Côte d'Ivoire), a newspaper circularized in Côte d'Ivoire.
- Le Jour (France), a French newspaper opposed to the 1930s Popular Front.
- Le Jour (watch), a watch manufacturing company.
- Le Jour (1937-1947), a Quebec anti-nationalist newspaper that existed from 1937 to 1947.
- Le Jour, Lebanese newspaper founded in 1933 that was merged in 1971 with L'Orient to form the L'Orient-Le Jour.

== Entertainment ==
- Le Jour Des Fourmis (Day of the Ants), 1992 French science-fiction novel
- "Le Jour Viendra", 1992 song by Algerian singer Khaled, on the Sahra album
- Le Jour se lève (Daybreak), 1939 French film
