= Shreemaan Aashique =

- Promotional Poster
- Directed by: Deepak Anand
- Written by: Kamlesh Pandey; Rumi Jaffery
- Produced by: Shakeel Noorani
- Starring: Rishi Kapoor; Urmila Matondkar; Anupam Kher
- Cinematography: Dinesh Telkar
- Edited by: Deepak Anand
- Music by: Nadeem-Shravan
- Release date: 5 March 1993
- Country: India
- Language: Hindi

Shreemaan Aashique is a 1993 Indian Hindi-language comedy film directed by Deepak Anand and produced by Shakeel Noorani. The film stars Rishi Kapoor, Urmila Matondkar, and Anupam Kher in the lead roles.

== Plot ==
Dushyant Kumar Mehra promises his uncle Professor Vishwamitra who runs an association of confirmed single men that he will remain single forever. His stance is a cause for concern for his parents, Kalidas Mehra and Suman Mehra. Dushyant travels to a hill station on a holiday and runs into Shakuntala who falls in love with him. He rebuffs her but she persists and soon he reciprocates her love. Professor Vishwamitra is very upset when he learns of this. What complicates matters further is that the professor himself falls in love with Shakuntala. Eventually Dushyant and Shakuntala end up together.

== Inspiration ==
This film's plot is strikingly similar to that of Shagird (1967).

== Cast ==
- Rishi Kapoor as Dushyant Kumar Mehra
- Urmila Matondkar as Shakuntala "Shaku"
- Anupam Kher as Professor Vishwamitra
- Bindu as Menka
- Mehmood as Mahesh
- Tiku Talsania as Kalidas Mehra
- Reema Lagoo as Suman Mehra
- Dinesh Hingoo as Anand
- Annu Kapoor as Masterji

== Soundtrack ==
The soundtrack of the film was composed by Nadeem–Shravan. The song "Ladki Ladki" is copied from the Arabic song "Didi" (1992) by Algerian musician Khaled.

Song	Singer
"Chum Loon Hont"	Kumar Sanu
"Dekha Jabse"	Kumar Sanu, Alka Yagnik
"Aasman Tak"	Kumar Sanu, Sadhana Sargam
"Abhi To Main"	Anupam Kher
"Bade Be-Sharam"	Asha Bhosle, Annu Kapoor
"Is Se Zyada Dukh"	Kavita Krishnamurthy
"Is Se Zyada Dukh"	Ustad Ghulam Mustafa Khan
"Ladki Ladki"	Sudesh Bhosle, Vinod Rathod
