= Bal privé =

Single by Preluders

from the album Girls in the House
- Released: 9 February 2004
- Length: 3:13
- Label: Cheyenne; Polydor
- Songwriter(s): Kristina Viktoria Johnsson; Jonas Blee; Håkan Lundberg
- Producer(s): Jörn-Uwe Fahrenkrog-Petersen; Gena Wernik

Preluders singles chronology
"Everyday Girl" (2003)	"Bal privé" (2004)	"Hotter than You Know" (2004)

"Bal privé" is a song by German girl group Preluders. It was written by Kristina Viktoria Johnsson, Jonas Blee, and Håkan Lundberg and recorded for the band's debut studio album Girls in the House (2003). Production was helmed by Jörn-Uwe Fahrenkrog-Petersen and Gena Wernik, with co-production by Felix Schönewald. The song was released by Cheyenne Records as the album's second and final single on 9 February 2004 and reached the top thiry of the German Singles Chart.

== Music video ==
A music video for "Bal privé" was directed by Katja Kuhl and produced by Bigfish Filmproduktion. It was filmed in January 2004 at Hotel Luc, the former Sofitel Berlin Hotel Gendarmenmarkt.

== Track listings ==
Maxi single
No.	Title	Writer(s)	Producer(s)	Length
1.	"Bal privé" (Single Version)	Kristina Viktoria Johnsson; Jonas Blee; Håkan Lundberg	Jörn-Uwe Fahrenkrog-Petersen; Gena Wernik; Felix Schönewald^{[a]}	3:13
2.	"Bal privé" (Acoustic Version)	Johnsson; Blee; Lundberg	Fahrenkrog-Petersen; Wernik; Schönewald^{[a]}	3:13
3.	"Bal privé" (House Version)	Johnsson; Blee; Lundberg	Wernik; Boris Köhler	4:15
4.	"Color Your Li'v'e"	Julian Feifel	Feifel	3:38
5.	"Bal privé" (Instrumental)	Johnsson; Blee; Lundberg	Fahrenkrog-Petersen; Wernik; Schönewald^{[a]}	3:16

Notes

- ^{^a} signifies a co-producer

== Credits and personnel ==
- Daniel Almeida Torres – piano
- Miriam Cani – vocals
- Anh-Thu Doan – vocals
- Jörn-Uwe Fahrenkrog-Petersen – production
- Artemis Gounaki – vocal arrangement
- Nik Hafemann – supervising producer
- Franka Lampe – accordion
- Rebecca Miro – vocals
- Anne Ross – vocals
- Patricia Sadowski – vocals
- Felix Schönewald – co-production, mixing
- Gena Wernik – production, mixing

== Charts ==
Weekly chart performance for "Bal privé"
Chart (2004)	Peak position
Austria (Ö3 Austria Top 40)	37
Germany (GfK)	28
Switzerland (Schweizer Hitparade)	60
