= Everyday Girl =

2003 single by Preluders

Single by Preluders

from the album Girls in the House
- Released: 17 November 2003
- Length: 3:23
- Label: Cheyenne; Polydor
- Songwriter(s): Fredrik Björk; Per Eklund
- Producer(s): Jörn-Uwe Fahrenkrog-Petersen; Gena Wernik

Preluders singles chronology
"Losing My Religion" (2003)	"Everyday Girl" (2003)	"Bal privé" (2004)

"Everyday Girl" is a song by German girl group Preluders. It was written by Fredrik Björk and Per Eklund and produced by Jörn-Uwe Fahrenkrog-Petersen and Gena Wernik for their debut studio album, Girls in the House (2003). The song was released as the album's lead single on 17 November 2003 and reached number one on the German Singles Chart while peaking within the top five in Austria and Switzerland.

== Music video ==
A music video for "Everyday Girl" was directed by Joern Heitmann. Produced by Katapult Filmproduktion, it references British singer George Michael's videos for "Freedom! '90" (1990), directed by David Fincher, with Tertia Botha, Miriam Cani, Anh-Thu Doan, Rebecca Miro, and Anne Ross replacing supermodels Naomi Campbell, Linda Evangelista, Tatjana Patitz, Christy Turlington, and Cindy Crawford.

== Track listing ==
Maxi single
No.	Title	Writer(s)	Producer(s)	Length
1.	"Everyday Girl" (radio version)	Fredrik Björk; Per Eklund	Jörn-Uwe Fahrenkrog-Petersen; Gena Wernik	3:25
2.	"Everyday Girl" (remix)	Björk; Eklund	Fahrenkrog-Petersen; Wernik	3:41
3.	"Wonderful Christmas Time" (Preluders single version)	Paul McCartney	Perky Park	3:35
4.	"Everyday Girl" (instrumental)	Björk; Eklund	Fahrenkrog-Petersen; Wernik	3:28

== Credits and personnel ==
- Miriam Cani – vocals
- Anh-Thu Doan – vocals
- Jörn-Uwe Fahrenkrog-Petersen – production, mixing
- Manfred Faust – additional mixing
- Artemis Gounaki – vocal arrangement
- Nik Hafemann – supervising producer
- Rebecca Miro – vocals
- Anne Ross – vocals
- Patricia Sadowski – vocals
- Jörg Sander – guitar
- Felix Schönewald – vocal recording
- Gena Wernik – production, mixing

== Charts ==
=== Weekly charts ===
Weekly chart performance for "Everyday Girl"
Chart (2003)	Peak position
Austria (Ö3 Austria Top 40)	5
Europe (Eurochart Hot 100)	10
Germany (GfK)	1
Switzerland (Schweizer Hitparade)	4

=== Year-end charts ===
2003 year-end chart performance for "Everyday Girl"
Chart (2003)	Position
Germany (Media Control GfK)	71
Switzerland (Schweizer Hitparade)	97

2004 year-end chart performance for "Everyday Girl"
Chart (2004)	Position
Austria (Ö3 Austria Top 40)	64
Germany (Media Control GfK)	89
Switzerland (Schweizer Hitparade)	99

== Certifications ==
Certifications and sales for "Everyday Girl"
Region	Certification	Certified units/sales
Germany (BVMI)	Gold	150,000^{^}
^{^} Shipments figures based on certification alone.
