= Abdel Kader (song) =

1998 single by Cheb Khaled

Song by Khaled

from the album N'ssi N'ssi
- Released: 1993
- Recorded: 1993
- Studio: Real World (Wiltshire)
- Genre: Raï
- Length: 6:08
- Label: Barclay/PolyGram (Europe)
- Songwriters: Traditional; Khaled Hadj Brahim; Mustapha Kada
- Producer: Richard Evans

"Abdel Kader (Live A Bercy)"

Single by Rachid Taha, Khaled and Faudel

from the album 1,2,3 Soleils
- B-side: "Menfi (Live A Bercy)"
- Released: November 9, 1998
- Recorded: September 26, 1998
- Venue: Palais Omnisports de Paris-Bercy (Paris)
- Genre: Raï
- Length: 5:12
- Label: PolyGram
- Songwriters: Traditional; Khaled Hadj Brahim; Mustafa Kada
- Producer: Steve Hillage

"Abdel Kader" (Arabic: عبد القادر) is an Algerian traditional song made famous by the Algerian raï artist Khaled. It is mistakenly thought to be about the Emir `Abd al-Qādir al-Jazā'irī, a famous Algerian Muslim religious leader and freedom fighter who resisted the French conquest of Algeria, but is actually about the 12th century Sufi saint Shaikh Abd al-Qadir al-Jilani (1078–1166 AD), the posthumous founder of the Qadiriyya Sufi Order. It is featured on his 1993 studio album N'ssi N'ssi. After his 1993 original album version, Khaled released a solo live version of "Abdel Kader" in his live album Hafla in 1998.

The song gained further popularity after the live performance at Palais omnisports de Paris-Bercy by Khaled, Rachid Taha and Faudel. The joint trio live version was included on the 1998 live album 1,2,3 Soleils.

== Charts ==
The live version by Rachid Taha, Khaled and Faudel was released as a separate single in France reaching #6 in the SNEP, the official French Singles Chart. The song stayed in for 21 consecutive weeks in the French charts in the period November 1998 to March 1999, with 10 weeks of those in the Top 10. It stayed at #6 for the two weeks ending 5 and 12 December 1998.

Chart (1998–1999)	Peak position
Belgian (Wallonia) Singles Chart	36
French SNEP Singles Chart	6

In France, "Abdel Kader" was certified Silver in 1998 by SNEP, signifying sales of over 50,000 singles.

== Covers and samplings ==
The song has been subject to many covers and remixes and is popular in live performances of many Algerian artists.

Adaptations

The music of "Abdel Kader" has been used with new lyrics and slightly amended music adaptations in other songs. One of the most notable of these is "Mon Bled" by Rohff, Mohamed Lamine and Cheba Maria. The track appears in the inaugural release of the Raï'n'B Fever series in 2004 produced by Kore & Scalp.

Samplings

Various songs have also sampled on parts of the song, notably:

- Cameron Cartio used a sample in his Persian language version of "Mi Chica" and Sarbel in the Greek language version of the same song.
- Ksenija Pajčin used the sample of the song in her 2004 song "Škorpija" released as part of her album "Sigurna."
- Arash sampled it in his bilingual Persian/English song "Suddenly" featuring Rebecca Zadig in Arash's 2008 album Donya
- Najim and Arash reused the sample in their 2009 trilingual French/Persian/English adaptation of "Suddenly" retitled "Près de toi (Suddenly)" also featuring Rebecca.
- DJ Rebel used the sample of the song in his 2016 single "Let Me Love You" featuring Mohombi and Shaggy.
- Farid Bang used the sample of the song in his 2019 single "Maghreb Gang" featuring French Montana and Khaled himself.

== See also ==
- `Abd al-Qādir al-Jazā'irī, the leader of the Zaouia (tariqa, group of followers) of Abdul-Qadir Gilani in Algeria
- Abdul Qadir (disambiguation)
