= Diamanti e oro =

Single by Gigi D'Alessio featuring Khaled and Jovanotti

from the album Nuje
- Language: Italian; Algerian Arabic; Spanish
- English title: Diamonds and gold
- Released: 31 October 2025
- Recorded: 2022–2025
- Genre: Pop; Arabic pop; Neapolitan
- Length: 3:13
- Label: Columbia Records; GGD Edizioni; Sony Music
- Songwriters: Gigi D'Alessio; Mahfoud Aghrich Abdelaziz; Samira Diabi; Ahmed Chawki; Lorenzo Cherubini
- Producers: Adriano Pennino; Max D'Ambra; Kekko D'Alessio

Gigi D'Alessio singles chronology
"Il codice dell'anima" (2025)	"Diamanti e oro" (2025)	"Mezze verità" (2026)

Khaled singles chronology
"Balatar" (2023)	"Diamanti e oro" (2025)

Jovanotti singles chronology
"Oceanica" (2025)	"Diamanti e oro" (2025)	"So solo che la vita" (2025)

Music video
- "Diamanti e oro" on YouTube

"Diamanti e oro" (transl. Diamonds and gold) is a song by Italian singer-songwriter Gigi D'Alessio, featuring Algerian singer Khaled and Italian singer-songwriter Jovanotti. It was released on 31 October 2025, through GGD Edizioni and Sony Music Italy, as the fourth single from D'Alessio's twenty-first studio album, Nuje (2025). The song heavily samples and interpolates the 2022 track "Diamantes y oro", originally performed by Khaled himself featuring Moroccan singer Chawki from Khaled's album, Cheb Khaled (2022).

== Background and release ==
Following the release of the singles "Cattiveria e gelosia", "Rosa e lacrime", and "Un selfie con la vita", D'Alessio announced "Diamanti e oro" as the fourth single from his album Nuje. The collaboration marks a Mediterranean crossover, bringing together D'Alessio's Neapolitan pop stylings, Khaled's traditional Raï music, and Jovanotti's rhythmic pop influences. The single was released to digital platforms and Italian radio stations on 31 October 2025.

== Composition ==
"Diamanti e oro" has a running time of three minutes and thirteen seconds. The song heavily samples and interpolates the 2022 track "Diamantes y oro", originally performed by Khaled himself featuring Moroccan singer Chawki. Because of the interpolation, songwriting credits are shared between Gigi D'Alessio, Jovanotti (Lorenzo Cherubini), Chawki, Mahfoud Aghrich Abdelaziz, and Samira Diabi. Production was handled by Adriano Pennino, Max D'Ambra, and Kekko D'Alessio.

Lyrically, the song acts as a musical bridge between cultures, sung in a mix of Neapolitan, Arabic, Spanish, and Italian.

== Music video ==
The music video for "Diamanti e oro" was released on 19 November 2025; it was directed and illustrated by Italian director Marco Pavone.

== Credits and personnel ==
Credits adapted from Apple Music and the liner notes of Nuje.

- Gigi D'Alessio – lead vocals, composer, lyricist
- Khaled – featured vocals
- Jovanotti – featured vocals, composer, lyricist
- Chawki – composer, lyricist
- Mahfoud Aghrich Abdelaziz – composer, lyricist
- Samira Diabi – composer, lyricist
- Adriano Pennino – producer
- Max D'Ambra – producer
- Kekko D'Alessio – producer
- Roberto Rosu – mixing engineer
- Steve Fallone – mastering engineer
