= C'est la vie (Khaled song) =

2012 single by Khaled

Single by Khaled

from the album C'est la vie
- Language: Algerian Arabic; French
- Released: 2 July 2012
- Recorded: 2012
- Studio: Mohito (Stockholm)
- Genre: Raï; dance; house
- Length: 3:50
- Label: Universal Music Division AZ
- Songwriters: Nadir Khayat; Alexander Papaconstantinou; Bilal Hajji; Björn Djupström; Achraf Janussi
- Producers: RedOne; Alex P

Khaled singles chronology
"Même pas fatigué !!!" (2009)	"C'est la vie" (2012)	"Hiya Hiya" (2012)

Music video
- "C'est la vie" on YouTube

"C'est la vie" (French for 'That's Life') is a song by the Algerian singer Khaled, from his seventh album C'est la vie (2012). It was produced and written by Swedish producers RedOne and Alex P. It was released on 2 July 2012, by Universal Music Division AZ as the lead single from the album. It was a summer hit for Khaled in France in 2012.

== Content ==
The song is bilingual, with the main verses in Algerian Arabic and the chorus in French. The chorus repeats the phrase:

On va s'aimer
On va danser
Oui c'est la vie
Lala, lalala...
We will love each other
We will dance
Yes, this is life
Lala, lalala...

== Charts ==
The song is considered to be a comeback for Khaled in France after a three-year absence in the charts. Released in July 2012, the song entered the official French Singles Chart at number 30 and later peaked at number 4. In addition to its success in France, it became very popular throughout Belgium and Slovakia, where it reached the top 10. In 2013, the single was certified Platinum by the Belgian Entertainment Association. The song also charted in the Netherlands, Romania, Sweden, and Switzerland and received radio airplay in Canada. "C’est La Vie" sold over 1 million copies in the European market, 1.8 million copies in the Middle East and North Africa, and over 4 million copies worldwide. The album reached number 5 on SNEP, the official French Albums Chart.

== Chart performance ==
=== Weekly charts ===
Chart (2012)	Peak position
Belgium (Ultratop 50 Flanders)	5
Belgium (Ultratop 50 Wallonia)	5
Czech Republic Airplay (ČNS IFPI)	1
France (SNEP)	4
Netherlands (Single Top 100)	92
Slovakia Airplay (ČNS IFPI)	2
Sweden (Sverigetopplistan)	34
Switzerland (Schweizer Hitparade)	33

=== Year-end charts ===
Chart (2012)	Position
Belgium (Ultratop Flanders)	52
Belgium (Ultratop Wallonia)	52
France (SNEP)	49
Chart (2013)	Position
Belgium (Ultratop Flanders)	64

== Certifications ==
Region	Certification	Certified units/sales
Belgium (BRMA)	Platinum	30,000^{*}
Italy (FIMI)	Gold	50,000^{‡}
^{*} Sales figures based on certification alone.^{‡} Sales+streaming figures based on certification alone.

== Cover versions ==
=== Marc Anthony version ===
"Vivir Mi Vida"

Single by Marc Anthony

from the album 3.0
- Released: 26 April 2013
- Recorded: 2013
- Studio: Hit Factory Criteria (Miami)
- Genre: Salsa
- Length: 4:11
- Label: Sony Music Latin
- Songwriters: Khaled Hadj Ibrahim; Nadir Khayat; Alexander Papaconstantinou; Bilal Hajji; Björn Djupström
- Producer: Sergio George

Marc Anthony singles chronology
"¿Por Qué Les Mientes?" (2012)	"Vivir Mi Vida" (2013)	"Cambio de Piel" (2013)

Music video
- "Vivir Mi Vida" on YouTube

"Vivir Mi Vida"
Sample from the Marc Anthony cover

In 2013, American singer Marc Anthony covered the Khaled song as a salsa tune titled "Vivir Mi Vida" ("Live My Life") for his studio album 3.0. This version was produced by Sergio George and recorded at The Hit Factory Criteria in Miami, Florida. Anthony performed it live at the 2013 Latin Billboard Music Awards. The music video, directed by Carlos Perez of Elastic People, was released on September 10, 2013. "Vivir Mi Vida" won a Latin Grammy Award in 2013 for Record of the Year and holds the record for the second-longest run inside the top-five in the Billboard Latin Songs, with fifty-one weeks. A "Pop" version was also produced using the instrumental of the original Khaled version and is included on the album.

In 2017, Anthony's former wife Jennifer Lopez covered the song in her "Spotify Session" as a tribute to his late mother and her former mother-in-law.

==== Track listing ====
Digital download
No.	Title	Writer(s)	Producer(s)	Length
1.	"Vivir Mi Vida"	Khaled; RedOne; Alex Papaconstantinou; Bilal Hajji; Björn Djupström	Sergio George	4:11

==== Chart performance ====
===== Weekly charts =====
Chart (2013–2014)	Peak position
Colombia (National-Report)	1
Mexico (Billboard Mexican Airplay)	16
Spain (Promusicae)	2
US Billboard Hot 100	92
US Hot Latin Songs (Billboard)	1
US Latin Airplay (Billboard)	1
US Latin Pop Airplay (Billboard)	1
US Tropical Airplay (Billboard)	1

===== Year-end charts =====
Chart (2013)	Position
Spain (PROMUSICAE)	11
US Hot Latin Songs (Billboard)	1
US Tropical Songs (Billboard)	1
Chart (2014)	Position
Spain (PROMUSICAE)	17
US Hot Latin Songs (Billboard)	8

===== Decade-end charts =====
Chart (2010–2019)	Position
US Hot Latin Songs (Billboard)	8

===== All-time charts =====
Chart (1994–2018)	Position
US Tropical Songs (Billboard)	13
Chart (2021)	Position
US Hot Latin Songs (Billboard)	21

==== Certifications ====
Region	Certification	Certified units/sales
Italy (FIMI)	Platinum	50,000^{‡}
Mexico (AMPROFON)	2× Diamond+4× Platinum+Gold	870,000^{‡}
Spain (Promusicae)	4× Platinum	240,000^{‡}
Spain (Promusicae) Remix version	3× Platinum	180,000^{‡}
United States (RIAA)	16× Platinum (Latin)	960,000^{‡}
Streaming
Spain (Promusicae)	Platinum	8,000,000^{†}
^{‡} Sales+streaming figures based on certification alone.^{†} Streaming-only figures based on certification alone.

=== Hashem Melech ===
"Hashem Melech"

Single by Gad Elbaz and Beni Elbaz
- Released: January 2013

Music video
- "Hachem Melech" by Gad and Beni Elbaz (in Hebrew and French on YouTube

Israeli singer Gad Elbaz created a new version of the song calling it "Hashem Melech" (in Hebrew ה' מלך) as a sort of contemporary Jewish worship song based on and adapted from "C'est la vie".

The Israeli version released in January 2013 as a duet between Gad Elbaz and his singer father Beni Elbaz contains Hebrew and French lyrics, though the Hebrew lyrics are not related to Khaled's all-French original lyrics and more geared to religious content. The chorus repeats the phrases (translation in parentheses and italics)

Hashem Melech (The Lord is King)
Hashem Malach (The Lord was King)
Hashem Yimloch (The Lord will be King)
Le'olam Va'ed (Forever and ever)

Elbaz also released an all-Hebrew version of the song. "Hashem Melech" was a minor hit in Israel and in Orthodox Jewish circles worldwide.

The Hebrew lyrics in the refrain are the same as those of a famous song also titled "Hashem Melech" by the well-known Jewish singer Yosef Karduner.

In September 2015, Elbaz released another limited version featuring additional vocals by the young Israeli child singer Yosef Chaim.

==== Hashem Melech 2.0 ====
"Hashem Melech 2.0"

Single by Gad Elbaz featuring Nissim
- Released: 2016
- Producer: Daniel Finkelman

Music video
- "Hashem Melech 2.0" by Gad Elbaz feat. Nissim (in Hebrew and English on YouTube

In 2016, Elbaz teamed with Hasidic rapper Nissim (full name Nissim Baruch Black, born Damian Jamohl Black and a convert from Islam to Christianity and eventually to Judaism) to create a rap-infused version of the song now titled "Hashem Melech 2.0" to distinguish it from the original Elbaz version. The rap by Nissim is primarily English language, and is said to dominate the song, wrapping around and throughout the elements of the original "1.0" song.

Still a bilingual song, "Hashem Melech" now featured Hebrew and English lyrics instead. Elbaz' original French lyrics were dropped in favor of English in the new version, but his Hebrew lyrics were retained for the new version. Nissim's rap segments were all in English. The popularity of the second version far exceeded that of the first.

Daniel Finkelman created a dance video of the new version, set against the New York City skyline and streetscape. The New-York themed music video features Elbaz and Nissim dancing and delivering their religious message dancing joyously through the New York city streets and on skyscraper rooftops, amidst a changing New York skyline, encouraging listeners to believe in a better tomorrow.

=== Ali B version ===
"Voy a Bailar"

Single by Ali B featuring Boef, Rolf Sanchez and RedOne
- Released: 28 July 2017
- Recorded: 2017
- Length: 2:38
- Label: Warner
- Producers: RedOne; Jordan Wayne

Ali B singles chronology
"Money voor mij" (2017)	"Voy a Bailar" (2017)	"Obesitas" (2017)

Boef singles chronology
"Come Again" (2017)	"Voy a Bailar" (2017)	"Antwoord" (2018)

Rolf Sanchez singles chronology
"Paso a Paso" (2017)	"Voy a Bailar" (2017)	"Te Va a Doler" (2017)

RedOne singles chronology
"Don't You Need Somebody" (2017)	"Voy a Bailar" (2017)	"Boom Boom" (2017)

Music video
- "Voy a bailar" on YouTube

In 2017, the Dutch rapper Ali B released the single "Voy a Bailar", largely an adaptation of the Khaled song but with adaptations from the Latin "Vivir Mi Vida" cover from Marc Anthony. Ali B added rap lyrics in Dutch. The release featured additional vocals by Boef, Rolf Sanchez and RedOne.

=== Charts ===
==== Weekly charts ====
Chart (2017)	Peak position
Netherlands (Dutch Top 40)	9
Netherlands (Single Top 100)	13

==== Year-end charts ====
Chart (2017)	Position
Netherlands (Dutch Top 40)	55
Netherlands (Single Top 100)	85

== In popular culture ==
The song became popular in Indonesia, a majority-Muslim country. A political campaign there in early 2017 developed a theme song called "Kobarkan Semangat Jakarta". Based on "C'est la vie" and "Hashem Malach", it created controversy as no attribution was given to either work. This sent the Khaled French version and surprisingly the Elbaz Hebrew version "Hashem Melech" to trend on Indonesian Twitter.

The Spanish version “Vivir Mi Vida” by Marc Anthony was played on August 12, 2023 at the Rogers Centre in Toronto, Ontario prior to the Toronto Blue Jays’ game against the Chicago Cubs during the Level of Excellence induction ceremony for Blue Jays great José Bautista; the song was played when Bautista’s family was introduced onto the field by the event’s MC, Hazel Mae of Canadian sports channel Sportsnet.

== See also ==
- List of number-one songs of 2013 (Colombia)
- List of number-one Billboard Hot Latin Songs of 2013
- List of Billboard number-one Latin songs of 2014
