= Preluders =

German pop girl group

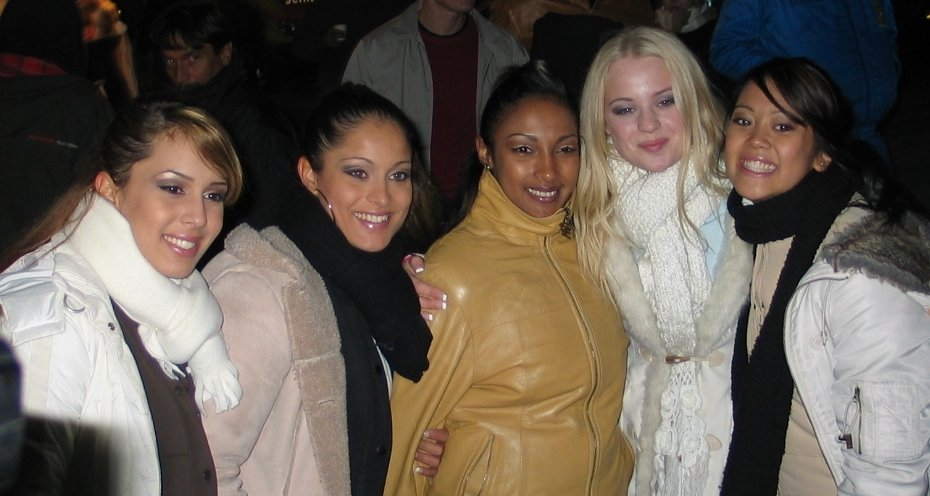
- Left to right: Miriam Cani, Rebecca Miro, Tertia Botha, Anne Ross and Anh-Thu Doan in 2003.

Background information
- Origin: Germany
- Genres: Pop; Europop
- Years active: 2003–2006
- Labels: Cheyenne; Edel
- Past members: Tertia Botha; Miriam Cani; Anh-Thu Doan; Rebecca Miro; Anne Ross; Patricia Sadowski

The Preluders were a pop girl group from Germany. The original group comprised singers Tertia Botha, Miriam Cani, Anh-Thu Doan, Rebecca Miro, and Anne Ross. Created through the ProSieben talent show Popstars – Das Duell (2003), in which male and female pop groups competed against each other, Preluders lost out to boy band Overground in a public vote. Despite their defeat, the group achieved commercial success with their first single "Everyday Girl", which became a number-one hit in Germany, while their full-length debut album Girls in the House (2003) reached the top five in Germany and Switzerland.

In 2004, Preluders released the cover album Prelude to History which underperformed on the charts, leading to their departure from Cheyenne Records and the leaving of Botha, Miro, and Ross. After signing with Edel Records, Patricia Sadowski joined the band, though single "I Want Your T.I.M.E." would remain their only release as a trio. After a relatively unsuccessful period, the three remaining girls disbanded in fall 2006.

== History ==
=== Formation ===
The Preluders were formed in September 2003 in front of millions of viewers on the ProSieben programme Popstars – Das Duell ("The Duel"). The concept of the programme was to produce a boy band and a girl band who would be rivals and compete for winning the third installment of the reality television program. Following the success of No Angels and Bro'Sis, 12,000 applicants attended auditions in five German cities in hopes of being selected for the show. Judged by rapper Sabrina Setlur, choreographer Detlef "D!" Soost, and producer Uwe Fahrenkrog-Petersen, 27 out of 46 contestants made it from the local recall shows to Orlando, Florida to get trained in singing, dancing and fitness.

While the judges continued eliminating two or three boys and girls each week, a small group of finalists remained, and in the end four girls were chosen to make the band: Anh-Thu Doan, Miriam Cani, Rebecca Miro, and Tertia Botha eventually formed the Preluders. While the show continued tracking the development and struggles of the new girl band and the final four members of Overground, the judges decided to add a fifth member to both groups after failed recording sessions. Selecting from the group of semi-finalists, they chose powerful-voiced Anne Ross to 'complete' the Preluders – and their promotional debut single, a remake of R.E.M.'s 1991 hit "Losing My Religion".

After three weeks of touring and promotional appearances across Germany, the season's finale was held on Wednesday, 3 November 2003. However, the girls failed to poll enough votes via telephone voting, and lost by scoring 48% against Overground.

=== Recording career ===
On 17 November 2003, the Preluders released "Everyday Girl", the first single taken from their studio album Girls in the House. The Fahrenkrog-Petersen-produced pop song debuted at number one on the German singles chart and reached the top five in Austria, Switzerland and Liechtenstein, eventually receiving a gold certification for more than 150,00 copies sold. On 24 November 2003 Girl in the House was released. While the album failed to chart within the top ten on the Austrian singles chart, it debuted at number two in Germany, and number three Switzerland, succumbing to Overground's successful debut album It's Done. In early 2004 the group followed-up with the album's second single "Bal Privé", a summer-lite pop song with French and English vocals, and James Bond music inspired "Hotter Than You Know", a previously unreleased record. Contrary to expectations both songs sold relatively weak, and peaked outside the top 20 on the charts.

In summer of the same year the Preluders began recording their minor succeeded second album Prelude to History, a retro album, fitted with cover versions and a few new records. The album's first single was a double A-side, consisting of a remake of Katrina and the Waves' 1985 hit song "Walking on Sunshine", and a re-recorded version of Christina Milian's Kim Possible theme song "Call Me, Beep Me". While the single failed to reach the top 50 in Austria and Switzerland, it became the band's third consecutive single released not to enter the German top twenty with a peak position of number 24. "Do You Love Me", the album's second single, even undercut this success with a low entry at number 50 only.

In the following months the band continued touring throughout Germany, occasionally performing on festivals and TV shows. Although the quintet made plans to release a third album together, Tertia Botha was the first member to leave the band because of a longer recovery process after a sudden car crash in June 2005; she was soon followed by Rebecca Miro. Miriam Cani, Anh-Thu Doan, and Anne Ross remained as a trio and prepared the release of their new single "Never Before" after signing with Edel Records. However, in December 2005 Ross also decided to leave the project (forming Milk & Honey with Manel Filali), and as a result the release was cancelled. In March 2006 original band members Cani and Doan welcomed a new bandmate, Patricia "Trish" Sadowski. The trio soon began recording new songs, including "I Want Your T.I.M.E.", which would become the trio's only release in July 2006, and peaked at a disappointing number 92 on the German singles chart. After months of rumors, the Preluders eventually disbanded without any kind of media circus in fall 2006.

== Members ==
Members	2003	2004	2005	2006
Tertia Botha	2003–2005			
Rebecca Miro	2003–2005			
Anne Ross	2003–2005			
Miriam Cani	2003–2006			
Anh-Thu Doan	2003–2006			
Patricia Sadowski				2006

== Discography ==
=== Studio albums ===
Title	Album details	Peak chart positions			Certifications
Title	Album details	GER	AUT	SWI	Certifications
Girls in the House	Released: 24 November 2003; Label: Cheyenne, Polydor, Zeitgeist; Formats: CD, digital download	2	12	3	BVMI: Gold
Prelude to History	Released: 27 September 2004; Label: Cheyenne, Polydor, Zeitgeist; Formats: CD, digital download	40	–	–	

=== Singles ===
Title	Year	Peak positions			Certifications	Album
Title	Year	GER	AUT	SWI	Certifications	Album
"Losing My Religion"	2003	—	—	—		Girls in the House
"Everyday Girl"	2003	1	5	4	BVMI: Gold	Girls in the House
"Bal privé"	2004	28	37	60		Girls in the House
"Hotter than You Know"	2004	21	49	53		non-album release
"Walking on Sunshine"	2004	24	54	68		Prelude to History
"Do You Love Me"	2004	50	—	—		Prelude to History
"I Want Your T.I.M.E."	2006	91	—	—		non-album release
"—" denotes a recording that did not chart or was not released in that territory.

As featured artist

Title	Year	Peak positions			Certifications	Album
Title	Year	GER	AUT	SWI	Certifications	Album
"Do They Know It's Christmas?" (with TV All Stars)	2003	3	28	32	BVMI: Gold	Ultimate Christmas Album
"—" denotes a recording that did not chart or was not released in that territory.
