= Prelude to History =

Studio album by Preluders
- Released: 27 September 2004
- Length: 42:04
- Label: Cheyenne; Polydor; Zeitgeist
- Producer: Andre "Brix" Buchmann; Thorsten Brötzmann; Ingo Politz

Preluders chronology
Girls in the House (2003)	Prelude to History (2004)

Prelude to History is the second and final studio album by German girl group Preluders. It was released on 27 September 2004 by Cheyenne Records, Polydor and Zeitgeist. A collection of cover versions of songs from the 1960s, 1970s, and 1980s, it features production by Thorsten Brötzmann, Andre "Brix" Buchmann, and Ingo Politz. Upon its release, the album underperformed, debuting and peaking at number 40 on the German Albums Chart. It spawned two moderately successful singles with "Walking on Sunshine" and a remake of The Contours' "Do You Love Me", resulting in lackluster sales in general.

== Background ==
Prelude to History was initially conceived after Cheyenne Records received an opportunity to cross-promote new music by Preluders during a 1960s-themed special week on Stefan Raab's late-night television show TV Total. The label subsequently developed the concept of the band's second album around this promotional opportunity, shaping the project around a retro-inspired theme.

== Critical reception ==
Professional ratings
Review scores
Source	Rating
laut.de	1/5 stars

The album was largely panned. Alexander Cordas from laut.de rated the album one out of five stars. He found that Prelude to History offered "the same old polyphonic sing-song over and over again, just as if the vocal coach had completely failed [...] There are one or two voices that have a penchant for gratification."

== Chart performance ==
Prelude to History debuted and peaked at number forty on the German Albums Chart in the week of 11 November 2004. The album marked a significant decline from the band's previous release, Girls in the House (2003), which had debuted at number two and later achieved Gold certification in Germany. The album would remain on the chart for nine weeks.

Band members Tertia Botha and Rebecca Miro later criticized the album's production process, stating that they felt it lacked a clear artistic direction from the label and contributed to the group's decline in commercial success following their debut. Miro was particularly opposed to the album's concept, reportedly expressing strong reservations about the retro-inspired direction and believing it did not represent the group’s artistic identity.

== Track listing ==
Prelude to History track listing
No.	Title	Writer(s)	Producer(s)	Length
1.	"We Go Together"	Jim Jacobs; Warren Casey	Ingo Politz; Brix	2:40
2.	"It's My Party"	Walter Gold; John Gluck Jr.; Herb Weiner; Seymour Gottlieb	Politz; Brix	2:17
3.	"Walking on Sunshine"	Kimberley Rew	Thorsten Brötzmann	3:35
4.	"Stand by Me"	Ben E. King; Jerry Leiber; Mike Stoller	Politz; Brix	3:54
5.	"Rama Lama Ding Dong"	George Jones, Jr.	Politz; Brix	2:17
6.	"Lollipop"	Beverly Ross; Julius Dixson	Politz; Brix	2:07
7.	"Do You Love Me"	Berry Gordy, Jr.	Politz; Brix	3:07
8.	"Caravan of Love"	Ernest Isley; Marvin Isley; Chris Jasper	Politz; Brix	5:42
9.	"Sweets for My Sweet"	Doc Pomus; Mort Shuman	Politz; Brix	2:25
10.	"Wake Me Up"	George Michael	Brötzmann	3:44
11.	"Call Me, Beep Me (The Kim Possible Song)"	Cory Lerios; George Gabriel	Brötzmann	2:36
Total length:				42:04

Bonus track
No.	Title	Writer(s)	Producer(s)	Length
12.	"Tequila" (Fan Version)	Chuck Rio	Politz; Brix	3:17

== Charts ==
Chart performance for Prelude to History
Chart (2004)	Peak position
German Albums (Offizielle Top 100)	40
