= Sahra =

Studio album by Khaled
- Released: November 8, 1996
- Recorded: 1996
- Studios: Artistic Palace (Paris); Chomsky Ranch (Los Angeles); Grove Yard Studio (Ocho Rios); Ocean Way (Hollywood); Studio Davout (Paris); Studio Zorrino (Paris)
- Genre: Raï
- Length: 1:06:21
- Languages: Arabic; French
- Label: Barclay
- Producers: Don Was; Philippe Eidel; Jean-Jacques Goldman; Clive Hunt

Khaled chronology
N'ssi N'ssi (1993)	Sahra (1996)	Hafla (1998)

Sahra is the third studio album from Algerian raï artist Khaled, released in 1996. It was the artist's biggest production to date, being co-produced by Philippe Eidel, Don Was, Jean-Jacques Goldman and Clive Hunt, and including performances by many other singers from around the world. It features what is perhaps Khaled's most popular song, "Aïcha". Most tracks are sung in Arabic, with a notable dosage of French. "Ki Kounti" is partially sung in Spanish as it features Mexican Rock vocalist Saúl Hernández from the band Caifanes. The title track is named after Khaled's first daughter, Sarah, to whom the album is dedicated along with his wife, Samira.

It included four singles. "Aïcha", "Ouelli El Darek", "Le jour viendra" and "Lillah".

== Critical reception ==
Professional ratings
Review scores
Source	Rating
Allmusic	3/5 stars

== Track listing ==
Credits adapted from.

No.	Title	Lyrics	Music	Length
1.	"Sahra"	Khaled	Philippe Eidel	4:12
2.	"Oran Marseille (Oran mix)"	Khaled	Khaled	5:08
3.	"Aïcha (Version Mixte)"	Goldman, Khaled	Jean-Jacques Goldman	4:19
4.	"Lillah"	Adem Fathie	Khaled, Lofti Bouchnak	4:24
5.	"Ouelli El Darek" (with the I Threes)	Khaled, Kada	Khaled, Mustapha Kada	3:11
6.	"Detni Essekra"	Khaled, Kada	Khaled, Kada	4:58
7.	"Walou Walou"	Khaled, Kada	Khaled, Kada	4:17
8.	"Ki Kounti" (with Saúl Hernández)	Khaled, Kada	Khaled, Kada	4:40
9.	"Wahrane Wahrane"	Ahmed Wahdi, Brahim	Wahdi, Brahim	4:40
10.	"Haya Haya"	Khaled, Kada	Khaled, Kada	4:37
11.	"Mektoubi"	Khaled	Khaled	3:55
12.	"Hey Ouedi"	Khaled	Khaled	4:12
13.	"Oran Marseille (Oran mix)" (with Akhenaton and Shurik'n of IAM)	Khaled	Khaled	4:25
14.	"Sratli"	Khaled, Kada, Eidel	Khaled, Kada, Eidel	4:36
15.	"Le Jour Viendra"	Goldman	Goldman	4:42

1997 CD reissue bonus track
No.	Title	Lyrics	Music	Length
16.	"Didi (BBB Radio Edit)"	Khaled	Khaled	3:14

== Certifications ==
Sahra certifications
Region	Certification	Certified units/sales
France (SNEP)	Platinum	300,000^{*}
^{*} Sales figures based on certification alone.^{^} Shipments figures based on certification alone.

== Release history ==
Region	Date	Format(s)	Label	Ref.
France	13 November 1996	CD; Digital download	Barclay	
United States	8 May 1997	CD; Digital download	Barclay; Island Records	
United Kingdom	2005	CD	Wrasse Records	
