= El Arbi =

1992 song by Khaled

Song by Khaled

from the album Khaled
- Language: Arabic
- English title: The Arab
- Released: 1992
- Recorded: 1992
- Studio: MicroPLANT (Los Angeles)
- Genre: Raï
- Length: 3:35
- Label: Barclay Records
- Songwriter: Khaled Hadj Ibrahim
- Producer: Don Was

Official audio
- "El Arbi" on YouTube

El Arbi (Arabic: العربي) is a song by Algerian singer Khaled, released in 1992 as the second track of his self-titled album released that year.

The song, according to Khaled, is an exaltation of his homeland. "There are no flowers or delights that can make me forget the desert", says a line from the song.

== Success in Brazil ==
The song was a huge success in Brazil in 1999 and 2000, seven years after its release. The song was also chosen by DJ Theo Werneck to liven up the appearance of the character Feiticeira during the program O+, on Band. It remained at the top of the Brazilian charts for 5 consecutive weeks, becoming the most played Arabic song in Brazil.

It ended up being included in the soundtrack of the soap opera Vila Madalena, on TV Globo, as the theme song for the character Marinalva, played by actress Rosi Campos.

Due to this success, the song's music video was featured for two weeks in the Top 20 of the Disk MTV program in February 2000, appearing in the week of 19 February 2000 at the 20th position and the following week it rose to 18th place on 26 February 2000.

Over the years, the song has continued to be remembered as synonymous with Arab culture for Brazilians. In 2022, 30 years after its release, El Arbi became popular again after Brazilians traveling to the 2022 FIFA World Cup in Qatar used the song in social media posts.

== Covers and versions ==
Via Negromonte recorded a Portuguese version of the song. "Me Leve" had been recorded for the album "Pura Eu" in 1997, well before the original version became successful in Brazil. With the success of the original version, Via Negromonte began performing the song again in concerts.

In 2000, the Rio de Janeiro-based comedic rock band Os Anjos parodied this song and recorded it on their self-titled album, "Vou Ter Que Rir" (I'll Have to Laugh). That same year, the group Café com Bobagem released a parody titled "Morrer De Rir" (Dying of Laughter) on their album O Humor Do Brasil! (Brazilian Humor!).
