= Robert Abigail =

Dutch DJ (born 1980)

- Birth name: Patrick Robert Abergel
- Born: 1980 (age 44–45) Rotterdam, Netherlands
- Genres: Dance
- Occupation(s): Disc jockey, record producer
- Instrument: Turntables
- Years active: 1996–present
- Labels: BIP records
- Website: www.robertabigail.be

Robert Abigail (born 1980) is a Dutch DJ.

== Biography ==
Robert Abigail was born and raised in Rotterdam (The Netherlands), where he started his successful DJ career at the age of 15 in a variety of different clubs.

In 2007–2008 he gained international fame by when one of his songs was used in a Bacardi rum commercial. His 2008 single, "Mojito Song", was well received from the commercial and was later released as an independent single which quickly went gold in Europe, reaching number 20 on the Dutch Top 40 and up to number 2 in Ultratop, the Belgian (Flemish) Singles Chart.

He has continued to cooperate with a number of acts, most notably Belgian DJ Rebel and M.O., on many hits in the Netherlands and Belgium with "Merengue" by Robert Abigail and DJ Rebel featuring M.O. as a great follow-up in 2009 to "Mojito Song". Abigail also cooperated with The Gibson Brothers on two hits, "Cuba" and "Non Stop Dance".

== Discography ==
=== Singles ===
Year	Single	Peak positions						
Year	Single	NED Dutch Top 40	NED Single Top 100	BEL (Vl) Ultratop	BEL (Vl) Ultratip	BEL (Wa) Ultratop	BEL (Wa) Ultratip	GER
2008	"Mojito Song"	20	4	2		2		–
2009	"Merengue" (feat. DJ Rebel)	42*	9	5		31		–
2010	"Good Times" (feat. Miss Autumn Leaves)	–	30	13		–		–
2010	"Meneando" (with DJ Rebel feat. M.O.)	–	–	10		38		–
2010	"City Where the Party's On" (with M.O. feat. Moonflower)	–	–	9		23		–
2011	"Cuba" (with DJ Rebel feat. The Gibson Brothers)	–	–	7		22		55
2011	"Amor prohibido" (feat. Ebon-E & Royston Williams)	–	–	–	29	–	42	–
2011	"Non Stop Dance" (with Philip D & The Gibson Brothers)	–	–	27		–		–
2012	"No vale la pena sufrir" (with Daniel Santacruz)	–	–	–	37	–		–
2012	"Culo!" (with DJ Rebel feat. M.O.)	–	–	21		45		–
2013	"Karma" (with Kate Ryan)	–	–	–	19	–		–
2013	"Fly" (with Brahim feat. P. Moody)	–	–	–	38	–		–
2014	"Hypnotize" (feat. Mr Z)	–	–	–	83	–		–
2014	"Mojito [2014]"	–	–	38		–		–

*Did not appear in the official Dutch Top 40 charts, but rather in the bubbling under Tipparade charts. For Tipparade peaks, added 40 positions to arrive at an equivalent Dutch Top 40 position in above tables
**Did not appear in the official Belgian Ultratop 50 charts, but rather in the bubbling under Ultratip charts. For Ultratip peaks, added 50 positions to arrive at an equivalent Ultratop position

Featured in

Year	Single	Peak positions		
Year	Single	NED Dutch Top 40	NED Single Top 100	BEL (Vl)
2009	"Party Jam (Say Whoop!)" (Nils van Zandt vs. Robert Abigail feat. Jay Ritchey)		90	–
