= Abdul Qadir (disambiguation) =

Abdul Qadir is a male Muslim given name.

Abdul Qadir or variants may also refer to:

== People ==
- Abdul Qadir (Muslim leader) (1872–1950), leader of Muslims in British India
- Abdul Quadir (1906–1984), Bangladeshi poet
- Abdul Qadir (Afghan communist) (1944–2014), Afghan military officer during the Saur Revolution and Minister of Defense during the Democratic Republic of Afghanistan (DRA)
- Abdul Kadir (cricketer) (1944–2002), Pakistani cricketer
- Abdul Kadir (Indonesian footballer) (1948–2003)
- Abdul Kadir (Turkish poet) (1917–1985)
- Abdul Qadir (Afghan leader) (c. 1951–2002), military leader of the Northern Alliance in Afghanistan
- Abdul Kadir (politician) (1952–2018), Guyanese politician and conspirator in a planned attack of JFK Airport
- Abdul Qadir (cricketer) (1955–2019), Pakistani cricketer
- Abdul Cader (cricketer) (born 1995), Sri Lankan cricketer
- Abdul Qadir (banker) (1903–?), Pakistani banker
- Abdul Khader, known by his stage name Prem Nazir (1926–1989), Indian actor in Malayalam cinema
- Justin Abdelkader (born 1987), American ice hockey player
- Emir Abdelkader (1808–1883), Algerian religious and military leader

== Places in Algeria ==
- Ouled Ben Abdelkader, a commune in Chlef Province
- Ouled Ben Abdelkader District, a district of Chlef Province
- El Emir Abdelkader, a municipality
- Emir Abdelkader, Jijel, a town
- Bordj Emir Abdelkader, a wilayah of Tissemsilt
- Bordj Emir Abdelkader District, a Tissemsilt Province

== Other uses ==
- "Abdel Kader" (song), an Algerian song made famous by Khaled
- Emir Abdelkader Mosque, a mosque in Constantine
- Stade Abdelkader Khalef, a football stadium
- Lycée Abdel Kader, a school in Beirut, Lebanon
- Ottoman battleship Abdül Kadir
- Berberia abdelkader, a species of butterfly from North Africa

== See also ==
- Main Abdul Qadir Hoon, a Pakistani TV drama serial
