= C'est la vie (Khaled album) =

Studio album by Khaled
- Released: 31 July 2012
- Recorded: 2011–2012
- Studio: Mohito Studios (Stockholm); RedOne (Tétouan); Badabing (Paris)
- Genre: Raï
- Length: 43:19
- Label: AZ Records
- Producer: RedOne; Alex P; Trevor Muzzy; Jean-Claude Ghrenassia; Adil K; David Rush; Bilal Hajji

Khaled chronology
Liberté (2009)	C'est la vie (2012)	Cheb Khaled (2022)

Singles from C'est la vie
- 1. "C'est La Vie" Released: 2 July 2012; 2. "Hiya Hiya" Released: September 2012; 3. "Dima Labess" Released: December 2012; 4. "Ana Aacheck" Released: February 2013; 5. "Samira" Released: October 2013; 6. "Wili Wili" Released: February 2014

C'est la vie is the seventh studio album by Algerian singer Khaled. It marks his first major collaboration with producer RedOne. It was released by AZ Records on 31 July 2012 and peaked at number 5 on SNEP, the official French Albums Chart. The Album sold over 4 million copies worldwide.

The songs utilize mainly Arabic, but there are also some French and English languages used. The title track "C'est la vie" was a successful single on the French Singles Charts reaching number four and was considered a comeback for him after a lengthy absence from the French music charts. There is a collaboration on the album by Pitbull on the EDM song "Hiya Hiya".

== Track listing ==
No.	Title	Writer(s)	Producer(s)	Length
1.	"C'est La Vie"	Sam Debbie; RedOne; Alex P; Bilal Hajji; AJ Junior; Björn Djupström	RedOne; Alex P	3:50
2.	"Hiya Hiya" (featuring Pitbull)	Debbie; RedOne; Pitbull; Alex P; Hajji	RedOne; Alex P	3:25
3.	"Encore Une Fois"	Debbie; RedOne; Alex P; Hajji; AJ Junior; Djupström	RedOne; Alex P	3:27
4.	"Ana Âacheck"	Debbie; RedOne; Alex P; David Rush; Adil K; Hajji	RedOne; Alex P	3:09
5.	"Dima Labess" (featuring Mazagan)	Debbie; RedOne; Issam Kamal; Alex P; Hajji	RedOne; David Rush	2:50
6.	"Elle Est Partie"	René Perez; Khaled (adapted)	Jean-Claude Ghrenassia	3:29
7.	"Laila" (featuring Marwan)	Debbie; RedOne; Adil K; Maurice Mamann; John Mamann; Alex P; Hajji	RedOne; Alex P; Trevor Muzzy	4:21
8.	"Andalucia"	Mohamed Kamel; Khaled (adapted)	Ghrenassia	3:13
9.	"El Harraga"	Hocine Lasnami; Debbie	Ghrenassia	3:23
10.	"Bab Jenna"	Debbie; RedOne; Alex P; Hajji; Adil K	RedOne; Alex P; Adil K	4:13
11.	"Wili Wili"	Debbie; RedOne; Hajji; Rush; Adil K	RedOne; Rush	3:59
12.	"Samira"	Debbie; RedOne; Alex P; Hajji; François Admouchnino	RedOne; Alex P	4:09
Total length:				43:19

== Charts ==
Chart (2012)	Peak position
Belgian Albums Chart (Flanders)	187
Belgian Albums Chart (Wallonia)	27
French Albums Chart	18
Swiss Albums Chart (Flanders)	96
Slovakia (IFPI)	20
