= Serbi Serbi =

Single by Khaled

from the album N'ssi N'ssi
- Language: Algerian Arabic
- English title: Pour Me
- Released: 1993
- Recorded: 1988—1993
- Studio: Ocean Way Recording (Hollywood)
- Genre: Raï
- Length: 3:51 (single version); 6:18 (album version)
- Label: Barclay
- Songwriter: Khaled
- Producer: Don Was

Khaled singles chronology
"Ne m'en voulez pas" (1992)	"Serbi Serbi" (1993)	"Chebba" (1993)

Music video
- "Serbi Serbi" on YouTube

"Serbi Serbi" is a song by Algerian singer and songwriter Khaled. It was released as a single from his second studio album, N'ssi N'ssi, on 1993. "Serbi Serbi" means "Pour me, pour me" in Khaled's native Arabic dialect. The original version of this song was recorded and released in 1988 as a track from his early album, Ya Taleb.

== Track listings ==
=== Version 1 ===
1. "Serbi Serbi" (3:51)
2. "Kebou" (Remix) (4:56) Ethnic Mix

=== Version 2 ===
1. "Serbi Serbi" (3:47)
2. "Kebou" (Ethnic Mix) (4:56)
3. "Ragda" (3:48)
4. "Didi" (Oasi Gimmick Version) (Radio Edit) (4:13)
