= N'ssi N'ssi =

1993 album by Khaled

Studio album by Khaled
- Released: August 17, 1993
- Studio: Ocean Way (Hollywood); Le Manoir (Léon); Antenna (Paris); Microplant (Los Angeles); Real World (Wiltshire); Studiomania; Bastille (Paris); Wessex (Highbury)
- Genre: Raï
- Length: 55:56
- Label: Barclay; PolyGram Records
- Producer: Don Was; Philippe Eidel; Richard Evans; Laurent Guéneau

Khaled chronology
Khaled (1992)	N'ssi N'ssi (1993)	Sahra (1996)

Singles from N'ssi N'ssi
- 1. "Serbi Serbi" Released: 1993; 2. "Chebba" Released: 1993; 3. "N'ssi N'ssi" Released: 1994; 4. "Bakhta" Released: 1995

N'ssi N'ssi is the second studio album by Algerian singer-songwriter Khaled. It was released on August 17, 1993, by Barclay Records and PolyGram Records. It was produced by Don Was, Philippe Eidel, Richard Evans, and Laurent Guéneau.

It includes the songs "N'ssi, N'ssi," "Chebba," is a re-recorded version of the same song included on his 1988 album, Kutché, which collaborated with Safy Boutella, "Abdel Kader," which are among Khaled's most famous, and "Alech Taadi" which was used in the film The Fifth Element. The lyrics are in Maghrebi Arabic except for a few occasional French words.

== Critical reception ==
Professional ratings
Review scores
Source	Rating
Allmusic	3/5 stars

The album has attained gold-level certification by the Syndicat National de l'Edition Phonographique.

In the US, the album was released by Cohiba, Mango, Island, and PolyGram Records. In 2005, Universal Music licensed the album for release in the UK and USA to Wrasse Records.

== Track listing ==
All songs written by Khaled Hadj Brahim except where noted.

1. "Serbi Serbi" – 6:18
2. "Kebou" – 4:53
3. "Adieu" (Hadj Brahim Khaled, Kada Mustapha) – 5:34
4. "Chebba" (Hadj Brahmi Khaled, Safy Boutella) – 5:39
5. "Les ailes" – 4:54
6. "Alech Taadi" – 4:09
7. "Bakhta" – 5:11
8. "N'ssi N'ssi" (Hadj Brahim Khaled, Kada Mustapha) – 3:30
9. "Zine A Zine" – 4:44
10. "Abdel Kader" – 6:08
11. "El Marsem" – 4:58

== Certifications ==
Country	Certification	Certified sales
France	Gold	100,000
Belgium		
