= Le Jour Viendra =

"Le jour viendra"

Single by Khaled

from the album Sahra
- Language: French
- English title: The day will come
- B-side: "Raikum"
- Released: 1997
- Recorded: 1997
- Studio: Studio Davout (Paris)
- Genre: Raï; Hi-NRG; power pop
- Length: 4:41
- Label: Barclay Records
- Songwriter: Jean-Jacques Goldman
- Producer: Jean Jacques Goldman

Khaled singles chronology
| "Ouelli El Darek" (1997) | "Le jour viendra" (1997) | "Lillah" (1997) |

Music video
- "Le jour viendra" on YouTube

"Le jour viendra" (French pronunciation: [lə ʒuʁ vjɛ̃dʁa]; lit. ' The day will come') is a song by Algerian singer Khaled. It was released on 1997 by Barclay Records as a single from his third studio album Sahra (1996). It was produced and written by Jean-Jacques Goldman.

== Track listings ==
=== CD single ===
1. "Le Jour Viendra" (4:41)
2. "Raikum" (inédit) (5:14)

=== 12" Single ===
1. "Le jour viendra" (Disco Insane Mix) (4:30)
2. "Le jour viendra" (Version Instrumentale) (4:30)

== Charts ==
=== Weekly charts ===
| Chart (1997) | Peak position |
|---|---|
| Belgium (Ultratop 50 Wallonia) | 12 |
| France (SNEP) | 24 |

=== Year-end charts ===
| Chart (1997) | Position |
|---|---|
| Belgium (Ultratop Wallonia) | 87 |
