= Imhotep (music producer) =

Algerian-French DJ and record producer

- Birth name: Pascal Perez
- Born: 19 May 1960 (age 65); Algiers, Algeria
- Genres: Hip hop, dub, trip hop
- Occupation(s): Record producer, composer, mixing engineer
- Website: imhotepofficial.com

Pascal Perez (born 19 May 1960), better known by his stage name Imhotep, is an Algerian-born French record producer and composer. In addition to his solo work including albums Blue Print and Kheper and producing of other artists, he was one of the founding members of the Marseille hip hop band IAM and its sound architect.

== Career ==
Pascal Perez after getting his graduate diploma worked as a school teacher for 4 years. But greatly influenced by music, having affinity to a number of versatile musical genres from the start, he played in a number of formations with blues, rock, reggae and funk influences. He also made the night circuits with electronic music and became a pioneer of beat-making in France.

In 1989, he joined IAM adopting the name of the historic Egyptian character Imhotep, alongside Akhenaton (Philippe Fragione), Shurik'n Chang-Ti Geoffroy Mussard, Khéops (Eric Mazel) and Kephren (François Mendy). Imhotep had major responsibilities in developing the IAM sound and using of Mediterranean and Oriental beat-making.

Besides his hip-hop influence in the band, Imhotep was also known for his solo artistsic work including release of a personal instrumental en 1998 named Blue Print mixing and recording Essaouira, Morocco. The album is influenced by Moroccan street vibes, and a unique rhythmic sounds of lounge music, reggae and dub, mixed with gnawa and North African music. The band is considered one of the best in French hip hop music.

With his own music label Kif-Kif Production, he produced Chroniques de Mars in 1998 followed by Chroniques d'Alger sampler also in 1998. The third in the series was Chroniques de Mars Vol. 2 in 2006 with a great tribute and promotion of Marseille rap and hip hop scene including Black Marché, Carré Rouge, Beretta, Chiens de Paille, 3ème Œil, Ligne 26, La Sale Équipe, Keny Arkana and others.

He also produced the debut album of Faf-la-rage entitled C'est ma cause in 1999 through his own Kif-Kif Productions company and in 2005, joined the collectif Desert Rebel, with various musical projects related to Tuareg guitar player Abdallah ag Oumbadougou. In 2008, he wrote the soundtrack of the Belgian film Les Barons directed by Nabil Ben Yadir.

In May 2012, he released yet another solo musical project Kheper, also an entirely instrumental album in the ancestral tradition of Blue Print inspired by a fusion of electronics and world music. He calls the genre Ethnotronica trying to promote a new fusion sound mixing of electronic music with ethnic traditional sounds and world music.

He has remixed and produced for musicians such as Absolute Beginners (Germany), LKJ (UK), PBS, Daara J, Negrissim' (Senegal), Cheb Mami, Cheb Khaled, Intik, Hamma Boys (Algeria), Ari, El Club de Los Poetas Violentos (Spain), Mr Catra (Brazil) and others.

== Discography ==
=== Albums ===
Solo

- 1998: Blue Print
- 1998: Chroniques de Mars (Vol. 1)
- 1999: Chroniques d'Alger
- 2006: Chroniques de Mars Vol. 2
- 2012: Kheper

with IAM

Refer to IAM discography

Soundtracks

- 2008: Les Barons (film by Nabil Ben Yadir)

Appearances

(selective)

- 2002: Erik Truffaz – Mantis
- 2002: Marseille Reggae All Stars
- 2006: Desert Rebel vol. 1
- 2007: Desert Rebel vol. 2 Ishumars Les Rockers Oubliés du Désert
- 2008: Idir – " Marche sur Jérusalem" with Akhenaton (La France des Couleurs)
