= Girls in the House =

Studio album by Preluders
- Released: 24 November 2003
- Length: 42:13
- Label: Cheyenne; Polydor; Zeitgeist
- Producer: Uwe Fahrenkrog-Petersen; Gena Wernik

Preluders chronology
Girls in the House (2003)	Prelude to History (2004)

Girls in the House is the debut studio album by German girl group Preluders. It was released on 24 November 2003 by Cheyenne Records along with Polydor and Zeitgeist. Entirely co-produced by Uwe Fahrenkrog-Petersen, and Gena Wernik, the album peaked at number 2 in Germany, number 4 in Switzerland, and number 5 in Austria, eventually receiving a gold certification for more than 100,000 albums sold. The album spawned three singles, including the promotional cover single "Losing My Religion", German number-one single "Everyday Girl", and bilingual "Bal Privé".

== Critical reception ==
Professional ratings
Review scores
Source	Rating
laut.de	2/5 stars

Stefan Johannesberg from laut.de rated the album two out of five stars. He found that Girls in the House lacked charisma but displayed "a few good approaches. Whenever fast-paced grooves dominate songs like the title track, the first single "Everyday Girl" or the straight "Riding On a Lovetrain", the vocals of the five young singers do not stand out in a negative way, but rather act as a nice-sounding accessory. There is simply not enough more."

== Chart performance ==
Girls in the House debuted and peaked at number two on the German Albums Chart in the week of 8 December 2003 – second only to Robbie Williams' Live Summer 2003. In 2004, it was certified Gold by the Bundesverband Musikindustrie (BVMI) for shipments figures in excess of 100,000 units. The album also reached number three on the Swiss Albums Chart and debuted at number 13 on the Austrian Albums Chart. It was ranked 77th on the Swiss Albums year-end chart.

== Track listing ==
All tracks produced by Jörn-Uwe Fahrenkrog-Petersen and Gena Wernik.

Girls in the House track listing
No.	Title	Writer(s)	Length
1.	"Girls in the House"	David Thomas; Mikael Albertsson; Simon Perry; Niklas Pettersson	3:20
2.	"Everyday Girl"	Fredrik Björk; Per Eklund	3:23
3.	"Bal privé"	Johnsson; Jonas Blee; Håkan Lundberg	3:13
4.	"Catch Me"	Mark Smith; Ulrich Wehner	3:28
5.	"Losing My Religion"	Bill Berry; Peter Buck; Mike Mills; Michael Stipe	4:22
6.	"Bye Bye for the Better"	Jörgen Elofsson; Fahrenkrog-Petersen	3:29
7.	"We Love to Entertain You"	Andi Gleichmann; Maximilian Kock	3:43
8.	"Riding on a Lovetrain"	Elofsson; Dan Hill; Mathias Venge; Peter Wennerberg	4:02
9.	"Sundown"	Niclas Molinder; Joacim Persson; Pelle Ankarberg; Andreas Mattsson	3:44
10.	"I Tattoo You"	Sergio Fertitta	3:35
11.	"You're Blocking My Sun"	Ina Wolf; Martin Frainer; Petra Bonmassar	3:32
12.	"Born to Love You Forever"	Billy Steinberg; Tommy Tysper; Gustav Jonsson; Marcus Sepehrmanesh	3:41
Total length:			42:13

== Charts ==
=== Weekly charts ===
Weekly chart performance for Girls in the House
Chart (2003)	Peak position
Austrian Albums (Ö3 Austria)	12
German Albums (Offizielle Top 100)	2
Swiss Albums (Schweizer Hitparade)	3

=== Year-end charts ===
Year-end chart performance for Girls in the House
Chart (2003)	Position
Swiss Albums (Schweizer Hitparade)	77

== Certifications ==
Certifications for Girls in the House
Region	Certification	Certified units/sales
Germany (BVMI)	Gold	100,000^{^}
^{^} Shipments figures based on certification alone.
