= DJ Rebel =

Belgian DJ (born 1984)

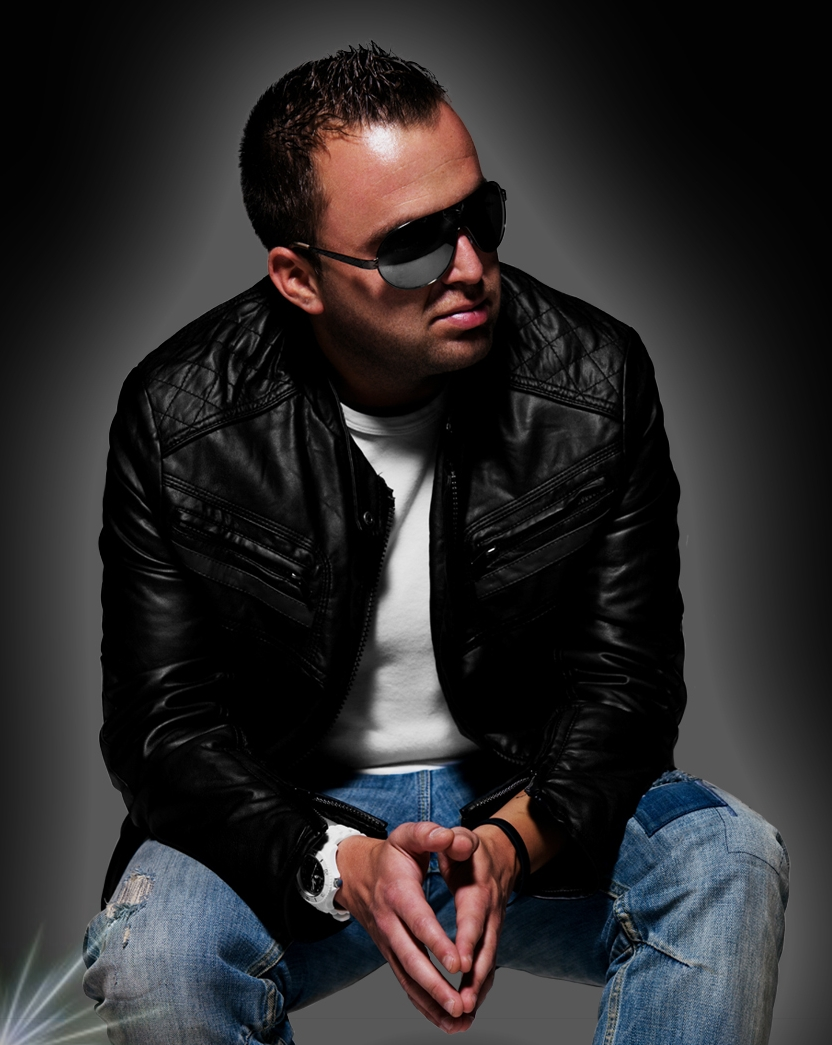
- DJ Rebel in 2011

Background information
- Born: Kevin Leyers; 22 July 1984 (age 41); Edegem, Belgium
- Genres: Electro house; progressive house; big room house; Latin house
- Occupations: DJ; record producer
- Instrument: Turntables
- Years active: 1998–present
- Website: djrebel.com

Kevin Leyers (born 22 July 1984), better known as DJ Rebel or at times just Rebel, is a Belgian DJ and record producer based in Antwerp and known for electro house, progressive house, big room house and Latin house music.

== Biography ==
He has been successful in Belgian night venues and the Belgian charts since 2008 when he released his bootleg release "Put Your Bucovina Up" remixing Ian Oliver's "Bucovina". Starting 2009, he has had a great number of hits in the Belgian charts the biggest being the Latin hit "Cuba" reaching number 7 in Belgium in 2011 and appearing on the German charts.

Rebel released his studio album Rebel & Friends after appearing in the Belgian Summerfestival under that name.

Rebel gained his biggest international chart success though through his 2014 remake of Klaus Badelt's 2005 composition "He's a Pirate" from the film Pirates of the Caribbean: The Curse of the Black Pearl through his 2014 remix titled "Black Pearl (He's a Pirate)" featuring Sidney Housen. It has been a hit in France reaching No. 4 and in Switzerland reaching No. 9 in addition to becoming a hit in Belgium.

== Discography ==
=== Albums ===
- 2013: Rebel & Friends

=== Singles ===
Year	Single	Peak positions				
Year	Single	BEL (Fl)	BEL (Wa)	FRA	GER	NED Single Top 100
2009	"U Got 2 Know"	25	21* (Ultratip)	–	–	–
2009	"Never Alone"	11	26	–	–	98
2009	"You Can Call Me Al" (DJ Rebel & FTW)	14	39	–	–	–
2009	"Meneando" (Robert Abigail & DJ Rebel feat. M.O.)	10	38	–	–	–
2010	"Bang!!!" (Rebel & Mystique)	43* (Ultratip)	–	–	–	–
2011	"Think About the Way 2011" (DJ Rebel feat. Jessy)	37	–	–	–	–
2011	"Cuba" (Robert Abigail & DJ Rebel feat. The Gibson Brothers)	7	22	–	55	–
2011	"Celebration" (Guy'Do & DJ Rebel feat. M.O.)	33* (Ultratip)	–	–	–	–
2012	"You Make Me Happy" (DJ Rebel feat. Danzel)	40	–	–	–	–
2012	"1, 2, 3, 4!" (DJ Rebel & Shutterz)	84* (Ultratip)	–	–	–	–
2012	"Black Pearl (He is a Pirate)" (DJ Rebel & Robert Abigail feat. M.O.)	21	45	–	–	–
2013	"Let's Go!"	46	18* (Ultratip)	–	–	–
2014/2015	"Put Your Hands Up"	–	–	–	–	–
2015	"Music"	29	38* (Ultratip)	48	–	–
2015	"Unattainable" (Rebel feat. Puck Cyson)	60* (Ultratip)	–	–	–	–
2016	"Missing" (Rebel feat. Brooklyn Rose)	Tip	–	–	–	–
2016	"Let Me Love You" (DJ Rebel & Mohombi feat. Shaggy)	Tip	–	–	–	–

*Did not appear in the official Belgian Ultratop 50 charts, but rather in the bubbling under Ultratip charts. For Ultratip peaks, added 50 positions to arrive at an equivalent Ultratop position in above tables

Featured in

Year	Single	Peak positions			
Year	Single	BEL (Fl)	BEL (Wa)	NED Single Top 100	NED Dutch Top 40
2009	"Merengue" (Robert Abigail feat. DJ Rebel)	5	31	9	42*
2011	"Angel" (Jessy feat. Kaliq Scott & DJ Rebel)	35	79*	–	–

*Did not appear in the official Belgian Ultratop 50 charts, but rather in the bubbling under Ultratip charts.
