= Liberté (Khaled album) =

Studio album by Khaled
- Released: March 30, 2009
- Recorded: 2008—2009
- Studio: Studio Davout (Paris)
- Genre: Raï
- Length: 73:43
- Label: Wrasse; AZ
- Producer: Martin Meissonnier

Khaled chronology
| Best of Khaled (2007) | Liberté (2009) | C'est la vie (2012) |

Liberté (transl. Freedom) is the sixth studio album by Khaled. Released in 2009, the album is Khaled's first studio album to feature original material following a five-year hiatus.

The Guardian, Friday 8 May 2009, in reviewing the CD, commenced with the comment that "Khaled, the "king of Rai", became a celebrity across Europe and the Middle East in the early 1990s, provoking scenes worthy of Beatlemania..." and noted that the new CD continued his "growing interest in acoustic styles".

== Critical reception ==
Professional ratings
Review scores
| Source | Rating |
|---|---|
| Allmusic | 4.5/5 stars |
| The Guardian | 4/5 stars |
| The Daily Telegraph | 4/5 stars |

The album marks a shift to a more acoustic Raï orientated sound. However, in contrast to his previous work, the album incorporates elements of Gnawa music, as seen on the track "Gnaoui. It also features Egyptian string performances recorded in Cairo. The album was recorded in the studio under live conditions to replicate the energy of his live performances.

== Composition ==
The meaning of the title track "Liberté" has been described by the artist as the attainment of freedom at the cost of ones innocence. Khaled describes "Sidi Rabbi" as a prayer for repentance for any pain he has caused to his parents. The album features two covers two songs by the Algerian artist Blaoui Houari; "Zabana" and "Papa". Zabana is a tribute to Ahmed Zabana, the first man to be executed by the French in Oran during the Algerian War of Independence; whereas "Papa" is a tribute to the memory of his late father and was co-written with French musician Philippe Gouadin.

== Live performance ==
On November 21, 2009, Khaled performed tracks from the album at the MGM Grand Las Vegas.

== Track listing ==
1. "Hiya Ansadou (Intro)" - 1:23
2. "Hiya Ansadou" - 4:49
3. "Raikoum (Intro)" - 1:20
4. "Raikoum" - 4:50
5. "Ya Bouya Kirani" - 6:23
6. "Gnaoui" - 5:39
7. "Zabana" - 8:19
8. "Liberté (Intro)" - 2:41
9. "Liberté" - 4:33
10. "Ghadni Soghri"
11. "Sidi Rabbi" - 5:35
12. "Yamina (Intro)" - 2:27
13. "Yamina" - 4:20
14. "Papa" - 5:24
15. "Maghboune" - 4:48
16. "Mimoune (Intro)" - 1:12
17. "Mimoune" - 4:54

The booklet of the French release on AZ contains French translations, but not the Arabic sung texts.
