= Melissa M =

- Born: Melissa Merchiche; August 21, 1985 (age 41)
- Origin: Marseille, France
- Genres: R&B; hip hop; soul
- Occupation: Singer
- Years active: 2006–present
- Labels: Universal Music France, Wagram Music, Up Music, Kilomaitre Productions, Music Art Production
- Website: melissa-lesite.com/home.html

Melissa Merchiche (born August 21, 1985, in Marseille), better known by her stage name Melissa M or simply Melissa, is a French R&B singer of Algerian origin. Her debut album entitled Avec Tout Mon Amour and two successful singles, "Elle" and "Cette Fois" was on April 23, 2007. Avec Tout Mon Amour was ranked in the French Top 50. Her second album entitled Melissa M was released in 2009. In November 2013 the single "Jump" was released to help promote her upcoming third album, which is still untitled. She currently lives in Gardanne, France.

== Biography ==
Melissa M was born on August 21, 1985, in Marseille, in the southern French region of Provence-Alpes-Côte d'Azur. Her parents are from the Algerian city of Béjaïa.

Passionate about music since her childhood, she began singing at the age of 10. She participated in various competitions in her hometown and while taking singing lessons. Her big sister entered a day at the age of 14 at issuance Seeds star 4, but lost in the final. At 18 while preparing for her CAP salon, she met the French production duo Kilomaitre. Originally she wanted to use the stage name Melissa but that name had already been taken by another singer. So she added the letter M, which is the first letter of her last name (Merchiche).

== Discography ==
=== Albums ===
Year	Information	Chart		
Year	Information	FR	FR (DD)	BEL (WA)
2007	Avec tout mon amour: First album studio; Date of release : April 2007	19	46	78
2009	Melissa M: Second album studio; Date of release : April 2009	-	-	–
2017	Inachevé: Second album studio; Date of release : June 2017	-	-	–

DD = Digital downloads

=== Singles ===
Year	Single	Chart			Album
Year	Single	FR	FR (DD)	BE (WA)	Album
2006	"Avec tout mon amour" (with Akhenaton)	–	–	–	Avec tout mon amour
2007	"Benthi" (with Khaled)	–	–	–	Avec tout mon amour
2007	"Elle"	1	23	24	Avec tout mon amour
2008	"Cette Fois"	4	28	–	Avec tout mon amour
2008	"Le Blues de toi" (with Pras)	-	-	–	Avec tout mon amour
2009	"Quoi Que Tu Dises"	-	-	–	Melissa M
2009	"Les Mots" (with Kery James)	-	-	–	Melissa M
2013	"Jump" (with JMI Sissoko)	-	-	–	Inachevé

DD = Digital downloads

== Awards/Nominations ==
Année	Récompenses	Nomination	Résultat
2008	Francophone Revelation of the Year	NRJ Music Awards	Nominated
2008	Best R&B Artist	L'année du hip-hop	Nominated
