= 100% Arabica (film) =

- Directed by: Mahmoud Zemmouri
- Written by: Marie-Laurence Attias; Mahmoud Zemmouri
- Produced by: Marie-Laurence Attias
- Starring: Khaled; Cheb Mami
- Cinematography: Noël Very; Jean-Claude Vicquery
- Edited by: Youcef Tobni
- Music by: Maghni
- Distributed by: Eurozoom
- Release date: 1997
- Running time: 85 min.
- Language: French

100% Arabica (1997) is a French comedy movie, directed by Mahmoud Zemmouri, starring Khaled, and Cheb Mami.

== Plot ==
The story takes place in 100% Arabica, a tough, poverty-stricken neighborhood on the outskirts of Paris. There are a lot of Algerian immigrants, some of whom are undocumented. Crime is a daily reality, even the police are afraid to step in.

== Cast ==
- Khaled as Rachid
- Cheb Mami as Krimo
- Mouss Zouheyri as Slimane
- Najim Laouriga as Madjid
- Farid Fedjer as Kamel
- Youssef Diawara as Sylla
- Patrice Thibaud as Bernard Lemercier
- Muhammad Camara as Salem
- Nedjma as Zoubida, Rachid's wife
- Medhi Bougima as Omar
- Bass Dhem as Un des 3 Diop
- Balla Touré as Un des 3 Diop
- Gaoussou Diarra as Un des 3 Diop
- Saïd Dahmani as Brahim
- Abdelmalek Fillali as Nordine
- Hassan as Rabah
- Philip Judith-Gozlin as Babou
- Mecky El Mazroui as Farid, Krimo's cousin
- Rachel Khalil as Malika
- Caroline Gay as Fatima
- Roger Muni as The deputy-mayor
- Michel Monsay as The mayor's deputy
- Fatiha Berber as Majid's mother
- Mahmoud Zemmouri as Tahar, the butcher
- Jacques Cuirassier as A kid on roller skates
- Tommy Dabadie as A kid on roller skates
- Hakim Naït Chalal as A kid on roller skates
- Rachid Abouhilal as Samy
- Djamel Allam as The Man with the Gun
- Rachid Belbachir as worshipper
- Djillali Belleissir as 2nd worshipper
- Ben Bellessir as Ben
- Kamel Boughezala as Farid, on the factory terrace
- Tassadit Bouyakia as Leila, Rachid’s sister
- Jacqueline Bugnot as The café owner
- Khalid Charghi as Momo, on the factory terrace
- Lionel Cherreaux as A police officer
- Francine Chevalier as Bernard's mother
- Jean-Christophe Coanet as The fake bailiff
- Jean-François Dinot as the first mover
- Nathalie Dubois as Zohra, Zoubida's neighbor
- Ingrid Dubois as the young girl in the restroom
- Alain Esnault as the second mover
- Mustapha Ghoumrassi as 1st nightclub bouncer
- Jean Gras as The café owner
- Mama Hammou-Mohamed as Aissa
- Hubert Helleu as a police officer
- Ahmed Khelfaoui as Ahmed, Rachid's brother
- Moriba Koïta as Sambou Daba
- Oumou Kouyaté as an African woman from the neighborhood
- Kristina as a woman from the neighborhood
- El Houari Lahcene Tobal as the bazaar security guard
- Robert Lucibello as the fake commissioner
- Mazouz Ould-Abderrahmane as the imam of barbès
- Abdelrahim M'hamdi as the second bouncer at the nightclub
- Cheikh Oumar Niang as the african by the brazier
- Malek Ramel as Mansour
- Franck Relandeau as a police officer
- Dany Smaïl as the inspector
- Myriam Sylla as Maïté
- Malika Tabi as Fatima's sister
- Mounir Zenati as Khaled
- Jeanne Zouari as Rachida
- Tina Winter as a young lady from the nightclub
