= Khaled (album) =

Studio album by Khaled
- Released: 1992
- Recorded: 1992
- Studio: MicroPLANT (Los Angeles); ICP Studios (Brussels)
- Genre: Raï; reggae; funk
- Length: 49:25
- Language: Algerian Arabic; French
- Label: Barclay; PolyGram
- Producer: Don Was; Michael Brook

Khaled chronology
Kutché (1988)	Khaled (1992)	N'ssi N'ssi (1993)

Singles from Khaled
- 1. "Didi" Released: 1992; 2. "Ne m’en voulez pas" Released: 1992; 3. "Mauvais sang" Released: 1992

Khaled is a self-titled debut solo studio album by Algerian singer-songwriter Khaled. It was released on 1992, by Barclay and PolyGram Records. for a major music label. The album was produced by Michael Brook and Don Was.

== Production ==
Khaled signed with French record label Barclay Records, then brought in American record producer Don Was to "incorporate American R&B—to Americanize the music", which Don Was achieved by combining Khaled's live musicians with loops and beats from his Macintosh computer and a keyboard. The result of these sessions in the studio that combined Khaled's rai with Was' R&B, was, according to Was, "pretty wild music."

== Reception ==
Professional ratings
Review scores
Source	Rating
Allmusic	4/5 stars

The album was primarily sung in Khaled's native Algerian Arabic dialect with the exception of "Ne m'en voulez pas", which was sung in French. According to some estimates, the album sold over 7 million copies and became the biggest selling Arabic album. The response from the Arab public was mixed. Many of the more conservative Arabs stopped buying his records and going to his concerts, feeling offended by exposure to what they perceived as the liberal West, and by what they saw as "(selling) out to Western commercialism". Others saw this as new, cool, and revolutionary, and he attracted a new audience.

The music from the album, especially "Didi," was played in French nightclubs and on Hip Hip Hourah, and the album began to sell well throughout France. The French emcee Abdelmalek Sultan of hip-hop band IAM called Khaled the "Public Enemy Arabe" and is regarded as the first raï artist to successfully cross over into the French pop market.

== Track listing ==
1. "Didi" – 5:02
2. "El Arbi" – 3:35
3. "Wahrane" – 4:27
4. "Ragda" – 3:51
5. "El Ghatli" – 4:07
6. "Liah Liah" – 4:21
7. "Mauvais Sang" – 6:13
8. "Braya" – 4:46
9. "Ne m'en voulez pas" – 4:57
10. "Sbabi" – 4:05
11. "Harai Harai" – 3:57

== Certifications ==
Region	Certification	Certified units/sales
Brazil (Pro-Música Brasil)	Platinum	250,000^{*}
^{*} Sales figures based on certification alone.
