= Didi (song) =

1991 single by Khaled

Single by Khaled

from the album Khaled
- B-side: "Wajabek"
- Released: 1992
- Recorded: 1988
- Studio: MicroPLANT (Los Angeles)
- Genre: Raï
- Length: 5:01 (album version); 3:20 (single version)
- Label: Barclay Records
- Songwriter: Khaled
- Producer: Don Was

Khaled singles chronology
"La Camel" (1988)	"Didi" (1992)	"Ne m'en voulez pas" (1992)

Music video
- "Didi" on YouTube

"Didi" (Arabic: دي دي, romanized: dī dī, pronounced [diː diː]) is an Arabic raï song written and performed by Algerian singer and musician Khaled, released in 1992. The song was the lead single from his eponymous debut studio album. Italian actress Valeria Golino appears in the music video for the song.

"Didi" peaked at number nine in the French Singles Chart and remained on the "Top 50" chart for 20 weeks, making it the first tune sung in Algerian Arabic to chart in France. It also topped the singles charts in Switzerland, Belgium, Netherlands, Egypt, and Saudi Arabia. The song also became popular in India.

The music video was directed by Philippe Gautier. The song was one of the opening songs for the 2010 FIFA World Cup.

== Track listings ==
France CD single

1. "Didi" (edit version) – 3:20
2. "Wajabek" (unreleased) – 4:25
3. "Didi" (Dimitri - Garage mix) – 7:40
4. "Didi" (Simenon mix) – 6:29

France 7-inch and CD single

1. "Didi" (edit version) – 3:20
2. "Wajabek" (unreleased) – 4:25

France 12-inch single
A. "Didi" (Simenon mix) – 6:29
B1. "Didi" (Edit version) – 3:20
B2. "Wajabek" (unreleased) – 4:25

Germany CD - BBB remixes EP in 1997

1. "Didi" (BBB radio edit) – 3:14
2. "Didi" (Hindi Version) – 3:16
3. "Oran Marseille" (Oran mix - featuring IAM) – 4:24
4. "Didi" (BBB Twink Muscle Mix) – 9:27

== Charts ==
Weekly chart performance for "Didi"
Chart (1992)	Peak position
Belgium (Ultratop 50 Flanders)	50
France (SNEP)	9
Greece (IFPI)	1
Netherlands (Single Top 100)	29
Switzerland (Schweizer Hitparade)	30

== Other versions ==
=== Covers ===
==== Brahim cover ====
"Didi"

Single by Brahim

from the album Najaha
- Released: 2005
- Studio: 5 Colors (Brussels)
- Genre: Pop rap
- Length: 3:36
- Label: White Label
- Songwriter: Khaled Hadj Ibrahim
- Producer: Fred Fraikin

Brahim singles chronology
"Loco" (2004)	"Didi" (2005)	"Lei lei" (2005)

Remix cover
- Cover of the remix featuring Nessa

Music video
- "Didi" by Brahim feat. Nessa on YouTube

The Moroccan-Belgian singer Brahim released a version of the song with added English language lyrics. The song reached #10 on the Ultratop 50 Belgian Singles Chart in 2005.

In a second release destined for the Moroccan market and the Belgian francophone markets (Wallonia), Brahim added a French language rap section featuring the artist Nessa.

===== Charts =====
Chart (2006)	Peak position
Ultratop 50 Belgian Singles Chart (Flanders)	10
Ultratip Belgian Singles Chart (Wallonia)	Tip 5

==== Milk & Honey cover ====
The German duo Milk & Honey released an all English language version with completely new lyrics and arrangement. It appeared in the band's 2007 album Elbi and was the second single release from the album after the initial "Habibi (je t'aime)". A separate EP was also released.

"Didi"

Single by Milk & Honey

from the album Elbi
- B-side: "Mon Cherie"
- Released: September 7, 2007
- Recorded: 2007
- Genre: Synth-pop
- Length: 3:22
- Label: Warner Music Group Germany
- Songwriter: Khaled Hadj Ibrahim
- Producers: Felix Schönewald; Uwe Fahrenkrog-Petersen

Milk & Honey singles chronology
"Habibi (Je T'aime)" (2006)	"Didi" (2007)	"7 seconds" (2008)

Music video
- "Didi" by Milk & Honey on YouTube

===== Track list =====
1. "Didi" — 3:21
2. "Mon Cherie" — 3:00
3. "Didi" (Algiers club mix) — 3:29
4. "Didi" (Tai Jason mix) — 4:12
5. "Didi" (M. Million mix) — 3:08
6. "Didi" (instrumental) — 3:22

The song was covered in Turkish by Tarkan for his debut album Yine Sensiz (1992) under the title "Kimdi".

It was also covered in Persian by Andy as "Laili" for his similarly titled album Laili, and in Greek as Giorgos Alkaios's debut single "Ti Ti". In 1993 it was also covered in Spanish by Antonio Carbonell.

In the 1990s, it was also covered in Albanian as "Ti më bën xheloz" by the Band Ilirët.

There was also an Urdu version of the song, "Babia" (1993), by Sajjad Ali.

In India, versions of the song became popular through plagiarized versions in local Indian languages. A popular version was the Hindi song "Ladki Ladki" in the Bollywood movie Shreemaan Aashique (1993), arranged by Nadeem-Shravan.

A Serbian copy was released by Dragana Mirković as "Baš tebe volim ja" in 1993.

The title was also covered in Russian language by Tatiana Parez in September 2004, who released it as CD maxi.

In 2007 the song was covered by a German girls band Milk & Honey, in an Arab and partial French translation.

In 2022 a Greek version was made by the Greek famous singer Helena Paparizou & Antique named "Ti Ti"

=== Samples and adaptations ===
This song was sampled loosely in the 1994 film Brahma by Bappi Lahiri and Kavita Krishnamurthy called Suno Suno Meri Rani Ji.

In 2007 a sample of the song was used in a song of the American singer Amerie in the song titled "Losing U" in her album Because I Love It.

=== Films ===
The song was almost completely featured in the 1995 Malayalam movie, Highway, with actress Silk Smitha dancing to the tunes. Just prior to the song, there is a brief part which shows the original song video by Khalid, being played on a television set.

A 2016 Bollywood movie named Airlift covered this song in Hindi as "Dil Cheez Tujhe De Di" sung by Arijit Singh and Ankit Tiwari.

A 2020 Indian movie in Malayalam named Dhamaka covered this song in Malayalam as "Potti Potti" composed by Gopi Sundar.

The song was covered by Morroccan singer Nabil El Elhouri and remixed with Kuwaiti hip-hop duo Sons Of Yusuf and Indian producer Shashwat Sachdev as "Didi (Sher-e-Baloch)" in the 2026 Hindi film Dhurandhar: The Revenge.

=== Television ===
It was sung by Red Dagger to Kamala Khan in the TV series Ms. Marvel.

In 1995, the song was sung by Sri Lankan singer Bathiya Jayakody and Gaminda Priyaviraj (later known for his work in the television series Api Nodanna Live) in a live recording that was televised on the local television channel TNL.

== Plagiarism controversies ==
In India, there was plagiarism controversy when several Indian musicians plagiarized "Didi" and produced unauthorized cover versions in local Indian languages. A popular version was the Hindi song "Ladki Ladki" in the Bollywood movie Shreemaan Aashique (1993), arranged by Nadeem-Shravan and sung by Sudesh Bhosle and Vinod Rathod.

On April 3, 2015, Khaled was charged for plagiarism of Didi, from Angui ou Selmi, an Algerian rai musical composition recorded by Cheb Rabah (born Rabah Zerradine) in 1988. Cheb Rabah was also compensated by Cheb Mami for plagiarizing his texts. But on May 13, 2016, Court of Cassation removed the charges against Khaled, when a 1982 audio tape with the song was shown. This tape was recorded by Khaled and given to a producer located in Oran, 6 years before Cheb Rabah's record. In the end, Rabah had to compensate Khaled for the fees during this case.
