= Philippe Eidel =

French composer and record producer (1956–2018)

Philippe Eidel (22 December 1956 – 6 September 2018) was a French music producer, writer and film music composer.

Philippe Eidel began his career working with groups like Taxi Girl and especially Indochine, in the middle of the new wave/synthpop period.

He moved towards world music and then collaborated with various artists such as the singer Khaled or the director Peter Brook, with whom he produced the album The Mahabharata, which is not the soundtrack of the film of the same name. Philippe Eidel then became passionate about old and traditional instruments.

He also composed numerous film scores such as that of Les Randonneurs. He is also the author of the original on-air credits for Canal+ and M6 with Arnaud Devos.
