= Anne Ross (German singer) =

German pop singer

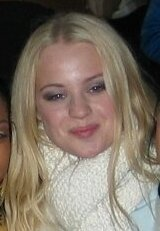
- Ross in 2006

Background information
- Also known as: Milk
- Born: 17 March 1985 (age 40); Dersum, West Germany
- Origin: Germany
- Genres: Pop
- Years active: 2003–2010
- Formerly of: Preluders, Milk & Honey

Anne Ross (born 17 March 1985) is a German singer. She was a member of the German pop girl group Preluders. After Preluders disbanded, she and Manel Filali teamed up to form the duo Milk & Honey.

She is married to Meiko Reißmann, a former member of Overground (band).
