= Khaled (musician) =

Algerian musician (born 1960)

- خالد
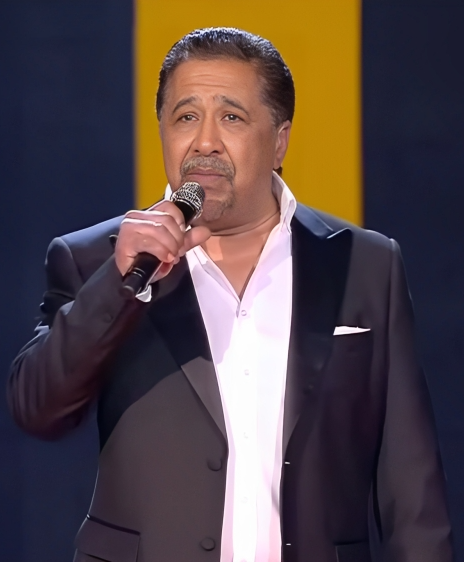
- Khaled performing in Arab Idol 2017
- Born: Khaled Hadj Ibrahim; 29 February 1960 (age 66); Oran, French Algeria
- Other names: Cheb Khaled; King of Raï; The Ambassador of Arab music
- Citizenship: Algeria; France; Morocco (since 2013)
- Occupation: raï musician
- Years active: 1974–present
- Spouse: Samira Diabi (Note: Her stage name is Sam Debbie) (m. 1995)
- Children: 5
- Musical career
- Genres: Raï; pop; blues; jazz
- Instruments: Vocals; guitar; darbuka; accordion; synthesizer; saxophone; trumpet
- Labels: Barclay; Universal; Wrasse Records; AZ Records; Aalia Publishing
- Member of: Agir Réagir
- Formerly of: Les Enfants Du Pays; Les Enfoirés; Sol En Si

Khaled Hadj Ibrahim (Arabic: خالد حاج إبرهيم, pronounced [ˈxaːlɪd ħaːdʒ ʔɪbraːˈhiːm]; born 29 February 1960), better known by his mononym Khaled (Arabic: خالد), is an Algerian raï musician. He began recording in his early teens under the name Cheb Khaled (شاب خالد, Arabic for "Young" Khaled, with "Cheb" as a common title for a male raï musician).

Khaled is one of the most important musicians in the history of Raï music in his native Algeria and is one the world's best-known African singers. To date, Khaled has sold over 80.5 million albums (10 diamond, platinum, and gold) worldwide, making him the bestselling Arabic-language singer in history. Among his most famous songs are "Aïcha", "Didi", "El Arbi", "Abdel Kader", "La Poupée qui fait non", "Wahran Wahran", "Bakhta", "C'est la vie", and "Alech Taadi".

He holds the Guinness World Record for best-selling artist of raï music.

Forbes has consistently placed Khaled in the top celebrities of Arab Music, and placed him at high ranks for years

== Early life ==
Khaled was born on 29 February 1960 in Oran's Sidi-El-Houari neighborhood, French Algeria. His father was a police officer.

Khaled showed a passion for music from an early age and, out of curiosity, experimented with several instruments, including the harmonica, flute, percussion and guitar. His preferred instrument was the accordion, which he played everywhere because it was the only one that did not require an outlet for. Noticing his interest, his father asked a cousin of Khaled’s, a carpenter, to build him a guitar, on the condition that he play it only at home and tell no one about it. Khaled could not bear to give up playing outside, however, and eventually defied the restriction. He spent little time at home and lived largely on his own from a young age, presenting himself as an adult.

At the age of 10, he formed a band called Les Cinq Étoiles (“The Five Stars”), which performed at weddings during the summer. Although he began by playing raï, he came to believe that the genre alone would not make him famous and that he needed to appear on television. He took his accordion to audition for Radiodiffusion-télévision algérienne (RTA) and performed a song by Fairuz. Though excited to reach the audition stage, he was nervous before the judges, and one of them interrupted his performance and dismissed him.

At 15, he recorded his first single, his first recoding, “Trigue Lycée”. His father learned of it when a colleague, from a police station, showed him the recording and remarked on how well Khaled’s records were selling. His father left work, went straight home and asked Khaled whether he was doing it for the money. His father regarded music as a dissolute pursuit associated with drugs and a path with “no future”, and Khaled’s mother, Khadija, would let him into the house after wedding performances without his father’s knowledge. His father later came to take pride in his son’s career after Khaled’s success and the albums he recorded abroad.

== Musical career ==
His rise to national fame was mainly due to the efforts of Lieutenant-Colonel Hosni Snoussi, director of the state-supported arts and culture Office Riadh el Feth, who took Khaled under his wing and invited him along with other rai stars to perform at the state-sponsored Festival de la Jeunesse pour la Fête Nationale in Algiers in July 1985. In the same year, he was crowned king of rai in the first official festival of rai which was staged in Oran.

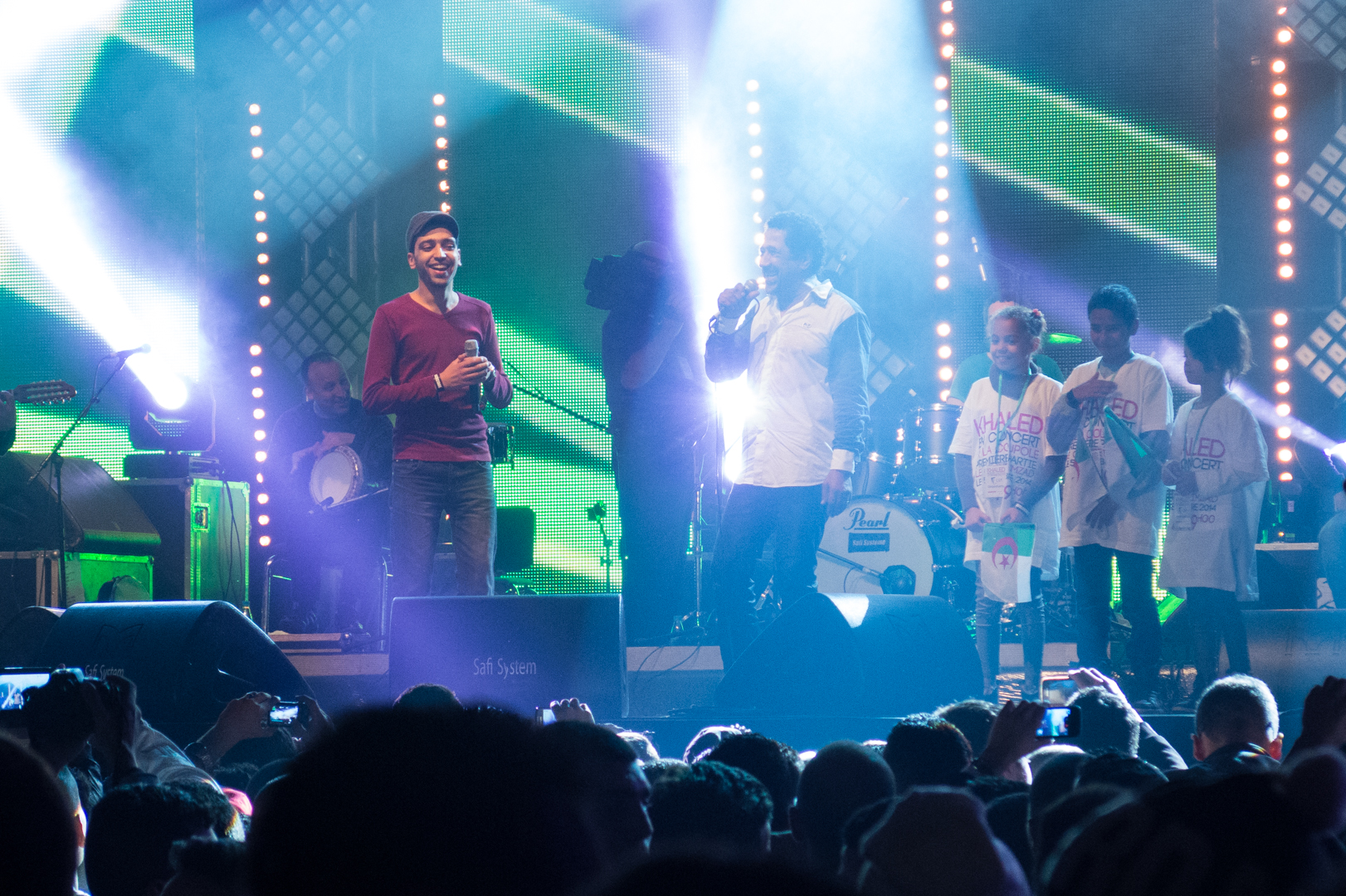
Khaled a la Coupole 2014 Algerie

Hosni Snoussi and Martin Meissonnier, who met at the Festival, convinced France's Minister of Culture Jack Lang that the export of rai from Algeria to France was in the French government's interest and together they organized the first rai festival in France at Bobigny in 1986. Cheb Khaled, who had been avoiding his mandatory military service, was able to perform at Bobigny only after Colonel Snoussi intervened with the Algerian military authorities to secure him a passport. Shortly thereafter, Snoussi arranged for Cheb Khaled to record in France, with funding from the Office Riadh el Feth. The album, Kutché, released in 1988, a collaboration between Khaled and the Algerian jazz musician Safy Boutella, expanded his reputation in France, where he soon settled.

In 1992, having dropped the "Cheb" from his performance name, he recorded Khaled, which was produced by Don Was. The album's first single Didi, which was a major hit in Europe, the Arab World, and in South and East Asia, made him an international superstar.

=== International impact ===
One of the Pioneers of world music, Rai musician Khaled has gone beyond all geo-political boundaries to become one of the world's most popular performers, mixing traditional Algerian music with western rhythms and styles such as soul, rock and reggae to achieve his distinctive sound and voice unlike anyone ever.

Khaled has been celebrated not only for his music, but for his role as a builder of bridges between cultures. selling more than 80 millions copies around the world makes him a nationwide celebrity and unofficial ambassador for the country's Arab minority.

—Food and Agriculture Organization of the United Nations, Rome, 2008

Khaled's signature song, the 1993 hit "Didi", became extremely popular in the Arabic-speaking countries and also in several other continents, including Europe, where it entered top charts in France, Belgium and Spain, and in Asia, including India and Pakistan. The song was also used in the Bollywood films Shreeman Aashiq, Airlift, Highway, and Dhurandhar: The Revenge. Khaled and producer Don Was appeared on The Tonight Show on 4 February 1993.

Islamic extremists opposed to perceived vulgarity in rai music have obtained fatwa condemning vulgar singers to death. Khaled has described himself as "at the top of the list of well-known people the fundamentalists want to kill" in consequence.

Khaled returned to the United States of America in December 2004 for a special guest performance at the Grammy Jam 2004 in Los Angeles, California. He joined a cast of celebrity artists honoring the band Earth, Wind & Fire, performing Brazilian Rhymes into "Didi" showing how their music crossed the world, fusing with his North African style.

In 2012, Khaled's album C’est la vie sold more than one million copies in the European market, 1.8 million copies in the Middle East and North Africa, and over 4 million copies worldwide. The album reached number 5 on SNEP, the official French Albums Chart.

On 3 April 2015, Khaled was convicted for plagiarizing "Didi" from Angui ou Selmi, a musical composition recorded by Cheb Rabah (born Rabah Zerradine) in 1988. But on 13 May 2016, Court of Cassation removed the charges against Khaled, when a 1982 audio tape with the song was shown. This tape was recorded by Khaled and given to a producer located in Oran six years before Cheb Rabah's record. In the end, Rabah had to compensate Khaled for the fees during this case.

In 2020, Khaled co-wrote and released a charity single, "Elle S'appelle Beyrouth," to benefit victims of the 2020 Port of Beirut Explosion to various charities in a collaboration project with Lebanese-born Brazilian DJ Rodge (born Roger Saad), which remained number one on Lebanese music charts for six weeks. After a decade-long hiatus from major studio album releases, he returned with the self-titled album Cheb Khaled in 2022. He later reunited with Rodge for the Qatar Airways-commissioned multilingual song "C.H.A.M.P.I.O.N.S.", in commemoration of the 2022 FIFA World Cup.

== Personal life ==
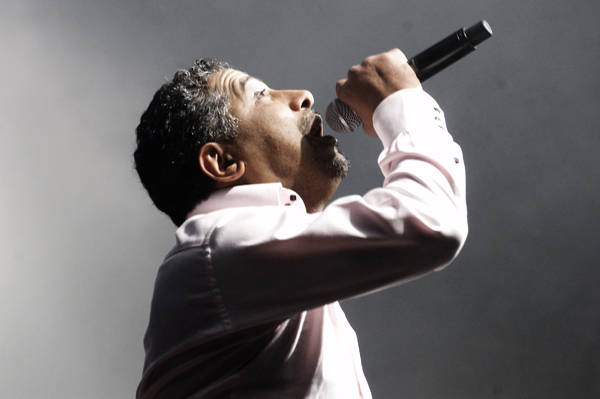
Khaled performing in Marseille (2009)

On 12 January 1995, Khaled married 27-year-old Samira Diabi in France. Together, they have four daughters and one son.

In 1997, his wife filed a complaint against him for domestic violence, before retracting the complaint.

In 1998, the biography Khaled: Derrière le sourire (French for "Khaled: Behind the Smile") was published, which recounted his life.

Khaled has an illegitimate son with whom he has no contact. Before a court appearance in 2001, he denied being the father of the child, continuing to claim that he had been "deceived". On the 7 May 2001, Khaled was sentenced by the Nanterre criminal court to a two-month suspended prison sentence for "family desertion". His move to Luxembourg in 2008, where he has been residing ever since, has reportedly been motivated by these charges.

He was awarded Moroccan citizenship in August 2013, which, according to him and his wife, he did not ask for but accepted because he felt he could not refuse.

== Discography ==
This discography does not include a number of albums released on cassette early in his career, and several bootleg/unofficial albums.

=== Studio albums ===
Year	Album	Label	Charts					Certification
Year	Album	Label	BEL (Fl)	BEL (Wa)	FRA	NED	SWI	Certification
1985	Hada Raykoum	MCPE	—	—	—	—	—	
1988	Kutché (with Safy Boutella)	Zone Music	—	—	—	—	—	
1992	Khaled	Barclay	—	—	—	—	—	
1993	N'ssi N'ssi	Barclay	—	—	—	—	—	
1996	Sahra	Barclay	24	7	3	33	26	
1999	Kenza	Universal	—	—	49	—	57	
2004	Ya-Rayi	Universal; Wrasse	—	41	52	—	70	
2009	Liberté	Wrasse; AZ	—	95	51	—	—	
2012	C'est la vie	AZ	—	27	18	—	96	
2022	Cheb Khaled	Aalia Publishing	—	—	—	—	—	
"—" denotes releases that did not chart or were not released

=== Live albums ===
Solo

Year	Album	Charts			Certification
Year	Album	BEL (Fl)	BEL (Wa)	FRA	Certification
1998	Hafla	28	—	29	

Collaboration

Year	Album	Charts			Certification
Year	Album	BEL (Fl)	BEL (Wa)	FRA	Certification
1999	1, 2, 3 Soleils (credited to Taha / Khaled / Faudel)	—	14	4	

=== Compilation albums ===
- 1991: Le Meilleur de Cheb Khaled
- 1994: Le Meilleur de Cheb Khaled 2
- 2005: Forever King
- 2005: Spirit of Rai
- 2006: Maghreb Soul – Cheb Khaled Story 1986–1990
- 2007: Best of
- 2009: Rebel of Raï – The Early Years

=== Singles ===
==== As lead artist ====
List of singles, with selected chart positions, showing year released and album name
Title	Year	Peak chart positions							Album
Title	Year	FRA	BEL (FL)	BEL (WA)	GER	NLD	SWE	SWI	Album
"Chebba" / "Baroud" (with Safy Boutella)	1988	—	—	—	—	—	—	—	Kutché
"Le Camel" (with Safy Boutella)	1988	—	—	—	—	—	—	—	Kutché
"Didi"	1992	9	50	—	—	29	—	30	Khaled
"Ne m'en voulez pas"	1992	—	—	—	—	—	—	—	Khaled
"Mauvais sang"	1992	—	—	—	—	—	—	—	Khaled
"Serbi Serbi"	1993	50	—	—	—	—	—	—	N'ssi N'ssi
"Chebba"	1993	—	—	—	—	—	—	—	N'ssi N'ssi
"N'ssi N'ssi"	1994	—	—	—	—	—	—	—	N'ssi N'ssi
"Bakhta"	1995	—	—	—	—	—	—	—	N'ssi N'ssi
"Aïcha"	1996	1	25	1	33	14	—	11	Sahra
"Ouelli El Darek"	1997	23	—	—	—	—	—	—	Sahra
"Le jour viendra"	1997	24	—	12	—	—	—	—	Sahra
"Lillah"	1997	—	—	—	—	—	—	—	Sahra
"La poupée qui fait non (Live)" (with Mylène Farmer)	1997	6	—	5	—	—	—	—	Live à Bercy
"Abdel Kader (Live à Bercy)" (with Rachid Taha and Faudel)	1998	6	—	36	—	—	—	—	1, 2, 3 Soleils
"Comme d'habitude" (with Rachid Taha and Faudel)	1999	40	—	40	—	—	—	—	1, 2, 3 Soleils
"C'est la nuit"	1999	29	—	35	—	—	—	—	Kenza
"El harba wine" (featuring Amar)	2000	20	—	—	—	—	—	—	Kenza
"Les ennemis (El Aâdyene)" (vs. Fonky Family)	2000	63	—	—	—	—	—	—	Kenza
"Wana wana"	2001	97	—	—	—	—	—	—	Non-album singles
"Agir Réagir" (with Jérôme Collet, Yves Lecoq, Sapho, Samira Said, Faudel, Elie Chouraqui, Sonia Lacen, Moise N'Tumba, Ishtar, Princess Erika, Amina, Gad Elmaleh, Youssou N'Dour, Lââm, Idrissa Diop, Daniel Lévi, Juste Pour Eux, and Jean-Jacques Goldman)	2004	38	—	—	—	—	—	—	Non-album singles
"Ya-Rayi"	2004	—	—	—	—	—	—	—	Ya-Rayi
"Zine Zina"	2004	—	—	—	—	—	—	—	Ya-Rayi
"La terre a tremblé"	2007	—	—	—	—	—	—	—	Best of Khaled
"Benthi" (with Melissa M)	2007	—	—	—	—	—	—	—	Avec tout mon amour
"Même pas fatigué" (with Magic System)	2009	1	—	10	—	—	—	49	Raï'n'B Fever, Vol.3: Même pas fatigué !!!
"Papa" (cover of Blaoui Houari)	2009	—	—	—	—	—	—	—	Liberté
"C'est la vie"	2012	4	5	5	—	92	34	33	C'est la vie
"Hiya Hiya" (featuring Pitbull)	2012	—	—	—	—	—	—	—	C'est la vie
"Dima Labess" (featuring Mazagan)	2012	—	—	—	—	—	—	—	C'est la vie
"Ana Âacheck"	2013	—	—	—	—	—	—	—	C'est la vie
"Samira"	2013	—	—	—	—	—	—	—	C'est la vie
"Wili Wili"	2014	—	—	—	—	—	—	—	C'est la vie
"Wahda Be Wahda"	2016	—	—	—	—	—	—	—	Non-album single
"Salama So Good" (with Andy)	2019	—	—	—	—	—	—	—	Cheb Khaled
"Delali" (featuring Gashi)	2020	—	—	—	—	—	—	—	Non-album singles
"Elle s'appelle Beyrouth" (featuring Rodge)	2020	—	—	—	—	—	—	—	Non-album singles
"C.H.A.M.P.I.O.N.S." (with Rodge)	2022	—	—	—	—	—	—	—	Non-album singles
"Trigue Lycée" (Remix featuring DJ Snake)	2022	—	—	—	—	—	—	—	Cheb Khaled
"Balatar" (with Tohi)	2023	—	—	—	—	—	—	—	Non-album single
"—" denotes a recording that did not chart or was not released in that territory.

==== As featured artist ====
List of singles as featured artist, with selected chart positions, showing year released and album name
Title	Year	Peak chart positions								Album
Title	Year	FRA	BEL (FL)	BEL (WA)	GER	AUT	NLD	SWE	SWI	Album
"El Oasis de los Dioses" (Ketama featuring Khaled)	1998	—	—	—	—	—	—	—	—	Konfusión
"Bladi" (Freeman featuring K-Rhyme Le Roi and Khaled)	1999	—	—	—	—	—	—	—	—	L'palais de justice
"Time For A Change" (The Rapsody featuring MC Lyte, Khaled and Danacee)	2000	—	—	—	—	—	—	—	—	Hip Hop Meets World
"Henna" (Cameron Cartio featuring Khaled)	2005	—	8	—	—	—	86	9	—	Borderless
"L'enfant du pays" (Rim'K featuring Khaled)	2007	32	—	—	—	—	—	—	—	Famille nombreuse
"Citizens of the World" (Pangea featuring Flying Machines, Khaled, King Sunny Adé, Kailash Kher and Cheng Lin)	2010	—	—	—	—	—	—	—	—	Non-album single
"Maghreb Gang" (Farid Bang featuring French Montana and Khaled)	2019	—	—	—	4	7	—	—	5	Torremolinos
"Diamanti e oro" (Gigi D'Alessio featuring Khaled and Jovanotti)	2025	—	—	—	—	—	—	—	—	Nuje
"—" denotes a recording that did not chart or was not released in that territory.

==== Promotional singles ====
List of promotional singles
Title	Year	Album
"The World Is Ours (Note: It is the Arabic adaptation of David Correy featuring Monobloco’s "The World Is Ours". The name of this adapted version in the Arab world is "Shajea Helmak" (Arabic: شجع حلمك, meaning "Encourage Your Dream"))" (with David Correy and Nancy Ajram featuring Monobloco)	2014	Non-album singles
"Taman Hayah"	2018	Non-album singles
"3ashan Nefham Ba’d" (with Mohamed Mounir, Amir Eid and Marwan Moussa)	2022	Non-album singles
"Yalla Bina" (with Jana Diab)	2026	Non-album singles

=== Appearances ===
Year	Song	Main artist	Album
1990	"Be Not Afraid"	The Blow Monkeys	Springtime for the World
1992	"Amdyaz"	Hector Zazou	Sahara Blue
1995	"Revolution, Revolutions" "ElDorado" (UNESCO official anthem)	Jean Michel Jarre	Concert Pour La Tolerance
1995	"Didi" (with Johnny Clegg)	Various Artists	Duos Taratata
1997	"Chanson du herisson"	Various Artists	Emilie Jolie
1997	"Koubou Koubou"	Various Artists	The Rough Guide to the Music of North Africa
1997	"Mâardi"	Various Artists	Sol En Si (Solidarité Enfants Sida)
1998	"Ensemble (Understand)" "Crimes"	Alan Stivell	1 Douar
1999	"Alby"	Amr Diab	Amarain
1999	"Alger"	Mousta Largo	Mektoub
1999	"Donner Pour Donner"	Les Enfoirés	Dernière Édition avant l'an 2000
1999	"¡Oh Madre!"	Tekameli	Ida y Vuelta
2000	"L'Aziza"	Various Artists	Balavoine Hommages...
2000	"Emmenez-moi"	Les Enfoirés	XXème siècle
2000	"Le Rêve de mon Père"	Kertra	Le Labyrinthe
2000	"Ojos de la Alhambra"	Vicente Amigo	Ciudad de los Ideas
2001	"Aich Rebel Sun"	Various Artists	Big Men, Raï Meets Reggae
2002	"Saludo A Chango"	Compay Segundo	Duets
2004	"Retour aux sources"	Kore & Skalp	Raï'n'B Fever
2004	"L'enfant du pays"	Rim'K	L'enfant du pays
2004	"Dance with me"	Enzo Avitabile and Bottari	Save the World
2006	"Mas Wi Loli"	Diana Haddad	Diana 2006
2006	"Face à la mer" (recorded in 1992)	Les Négresses Vertes	À l'affiche (Best of),
2006	"El Marsem"	Enrique Morente	Morente sueña la Alhambra (DVD)
2007	"Bilovengo" "Erjaii Ya Alf Leiïla (Mille Et Une Nuits Sans Toi)"	Bratsch	Plein du monde
2007	"Salam"	Andy, Hakim	Airport
2009	"Avec le sourire"	Bisso Na Bisso	Africa
2012	"Mazal Wakfin"	Warda Al-Jazairia, Baaziz	Non-album single
2012	"L'Oriental"	Enrico Macias	Venez tous mes amis!
2013	"El Baraka"	Rim'K, Cheba Zahouania	Non-album single
2013	"Larosa"	Medina	Sista Minuten
2013	"Paris Marseille Alger"	Morsay, Maliano	Le son du ter ter 4
2018	"We Enta Maaya"	Tamer Hosny	Eish Besho'ak
2018	"Mirage"	Soolking	Fruit du démon

=== Soundtracks ===
Year	Song	Soundtrack
1995	"Soul Fusion"(with Bellek)	Raï
1997	"Wahrane Wahrane" "Cameleons" (with Cheb Mami)	100% Arabica
2000	"Wana Wana Aamel Eih" "Dour Biha Ya Chibani"	Origine contrôlée
2004		De l'autre côté
2006	"Ya Dzayer" "Mort de Messaoud" "Nostalgie" "Sur la tombe" "El Babour"	Indigènes (Days of Glory)
2007	"Benthi" (with Mélissa M)	Taxi 4

== Filmography ==
- 1997 100% Arabica
- 1997 Le Centre de visionnage
- 2003 Art'n Acte Production
- 2004 We Are the Future
- 2026 Hadoota

== Honours ==
- First Arab singer to win World Music Awards (1992).
- First Arab singer to hold a Guinness World Record for Best-selling artist of raï music (2000).
- Only Arab singer to perform at Fifa World Cup ceremony (2010).
- FAO goodwill ambassador.
- Only Arab singer to perform at European Athletics Championships (2006).
- Was named top 50 Voices in the World by NPR.
- Is decorated « Chevalier des arts et des lettres »
- First Rai singer to be named Cheb in 1974 which means (young man), and then all rai singers named (Cheb) or (Cheba) after Khaled.
- First and only Arab singer to perform in many countries all over the world such as USA, Canada, Japan (1989), Netherlands, Turkey (1996), Germany, Portugal (2018), Italy, Brazil (2000), Spain, England, Denmark, Norway, Switzerland, Mauritius (2014), Slovenia, Ethiopia (2014), South Africa (2010), Senegal (2014), India (1992), Greece (2006), Hungary and Luxembourg.
- Only Arab singer to chart in France, Sweden, Belgium, USA, Netherlands, Germany, Switzerland, Austria, Slovakia.
- First Arab singer to chart in Billboards Hot 100.
- First Arab singer to chart in France Charts.
- First Arab singer to chart in European Hot 100 singles (2009).
- First Arab singer to chart in Brazil for the song (El Arbi)
- Only Arab Musician to win Cesar Award (1994).
- Only Arab (Musician) to Win Venice Film Festival award (1993).
- Most-singing Arab singer in L'Olympia in Paris (5 times).
- Sold over 80.5 million albums (10 diamond, platinum, and gold) worldwide.
- Considered one of the most-selling Arab singers of all time.

== Awards ==
Award	Year	Nominee(s)	Category	Result	Ref.
BBC Radio 3 Awards for World Music	2004	Himself	Middle East and North Africa	Nominated	
BBC Radio 3 Awards for World Music	2005	Himself	Middle East and North Africa	Won	
César Awards	1994	1, 2, 3, Sun	Best Original Music	Won	
GQ Awards	2019	Himself	Legend Award	Won	
Kora Awards	1997	Himself	Best Male Artist of North Africa	Won	
Kora Awards	2012	Himself	Best Male Artist of North Africa	Won	
NRJ Music Awards	2010	Khaled, Raï'n'B, Magic System	Francophone Duo/Group of the Year	Nominated	
Venice Film Festival	1993	1, 2, 3, Sun	Golden Osella for Best Music	Won	
Victoires de la Musique	1995	Himself	Francophone Artist or Group of the Year	Won	
Victoires de la Musique	1997	Himself	Francophone Artist or Group of the Year	Nominated	
Victoires de la Musique	1997	"Aïcha"	Original Song of the Year	Won	
Victoires de la Musique	2013	C'est la vie	World Music Album of the Year	Nominated	
World Music Awards	1997	Himself	World's Best Selling African Artist of the Year	Won	
World Music Awards	2000	Khaled, Rachid Taha, Faudel	World's Best Selling Arabic Act	Won	
World Music Awards	2014	Himself	World's Best Selling Algerian Artist	Won	
World Music Awards	2014	Himself	World's Best Male Artist	Nominated	
World Music Awards	2014	Himself	World's Best Live Act	Nominated	
World Music Awards	2014	Himself	World's Best Entertainer	Nominated	
World Music Awards	2014	C'est la vie	World's Best Album	Nominated	

- 1985: First Prize of Rai Music (KING) Oran
- 1989: Best Song (chebba) in France
- 1989: Top 100 Best Album in 20th Century (kutché)
- 1992: Top 50 MTV America (didi)
- 1992: MTV India Awards (didi)
- 2004: Grammy Jam Awards (Khaled and Carlos Santana) ("Love to the people")
- 2005: Montreal International Jazz Festival (The Antonio Carlos-Jobim Award)
- 2005: ImagineNations and DC Internationals (Empowering Award, for spreading the message of peace)
- 2006: The Mediterranean Prize for Creativity
- 2008: Award Dutch Virsti – German Academy of Music
- 2009: NME Awards 2009 (meilleur duo) avec Magic System
- 2009: MGM Awards (highest-selling Arab album in history) (The legendary) (Las Vegas)
- 2010: Big Apple Music Awards (best Arab artist selling in United States)
- 2010: One of 50 Great Voices profiled by NPR
- 2013: Murex D'Or 2013 – Best International Song & Best International Singer – Cheb Khaled – ("C'est La Vie")
- 2013: Rabab d’or Prix d'honneur – Maroc Festival International Al Ansra de M’diq ("C'est La Vie")
- 2013: Festival International de la Musique Kabyle à Tanger festival Touiza MAROC 2013 ("C'est La Vie")
- 2016: XLII Universal Music Award – Vienna 2016 – for "C'est La Vie" as Best Song.
