= Algerian art =

Visual arts of Algeria

Algerian art encompasses the visual arts produced in and associated with Algeria from prehistory to the present, including rock art, Islamic decorative arts, Amazigh (Berber) craft traditions, the artistic heritage of Algeria's Jewish communities, colonial-era painting, and modern and contemporary fine art. Shaped by successive Numidian, Punic, Roman, Vandal, Byzantine, Arab, Ottoman, and French influences, Algerian art reflects a layered cultural history in which Berber, Arab-Islamic, Jewish, and European traditions have interacted, competed, and blended over several millennia.

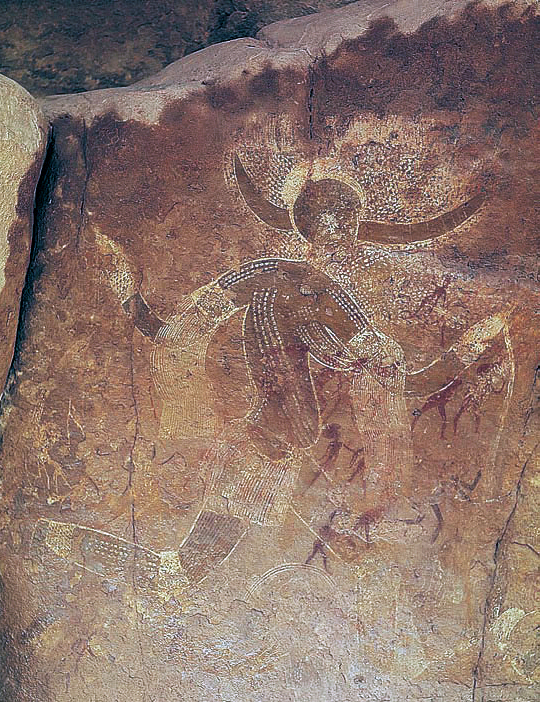
North African rock painting representing 'a horned goddess', Aouanrhet, Tassili N' Ajjer, Algeria, Round Head period.

== Prehistoric and ancient art ==
Algeria holds one of the richest concentrations of rock art in the world, concentrated in the Tassili n'Ajjer plateau in the Sahara, inscribed as a UNESCO World Heritage Site in 1986. The site contains more than 15,000 paintings and engravings dating back as far as 12,000 years, documenting environmental and cultural change across the Sahara from a period when the region was fertile grassland through to its desertification. Among the best-known works are the "Round Head" paintings, first studied and published in the 1930s by the French archaeologist Henri Lhote; these are thought to be among the oldest layers of the site's rock art. Later phases depict cattle-herding scenes, and still later ones show horses, chariots, and camels, reflecting the changing economies and populations of the Sahara over time.

Beyond the Sahara, the Numidian and Punic periods left behind funerary monuments, mosaics, and sculpture, most notably the Royal Mausoleum of Mauretania near Tipaza. The Roman era, which followed the fall of Carthage, produced extensive civic and decorative art across sites such as Timgad, Djémila, Tipaza, and Cherchell, including mosaics, statuary, and architectural ornament that remain among the best-preserved Roman provincial remains in North Africa.

== Islamic and Amazigh (Berber) traditions ==
With the Arab conquest of the Maghreb from the 7th century and the subsequent spread of Islam, figurative representation of living beings receded from religious and much of public art, and ornamental, geometric, and calligraphic decoration became the dominant visual language. Arabesque and calligraphic ornament was for centuries essentially the only widely tolerated pictorial idiom, and it left a lasting imprint on Algerian visual culture, including in works by later modern artists who returned to calligraphic and sign-based abstraction.

Architecture across this long period absorbed successive influences: Almoravid and Almohad styles associated with Andalusian craftsmanship, and later Ottoman styles introduced after the Regency of Algiers came under Ottoman suzerainty in the 16th century. Ottoman-period mosques and palaces in Algiers, such as the Ketchaoua Mosque, combined Ottoman domes and tilework with local building traditions, while the M'Zab Valley in the northern Sahara developed a highly distinctive fortified urban architecture of ksour (fortified villages) adapted to a harsh desert climate.

Amazigh (Berber) visual culture, especially in Kabylia, the Aurès, and the M'Zab, maintained a largely separate and continuous set of traditions centered on textiles, pottery, and jewelry. In Kabylia in particular, pottery-making and weaving were historically women's crafts, passed down within families and villages, with women drawing on a shared vocabulary of geometric symbols while working within the design tradition of their own tribe or village. Kabyle silver jewelry, often combined with coral, enamel, and niello work, developed into an especially well-known craft, produced by specialized silversmith families and worn as part of women's ceremonial dress. Berber wall painting, tattooing, and carpet weaving employed related geometric and symbolic vocabularies that would later directly influence twentieth-century modern Algerian painters.

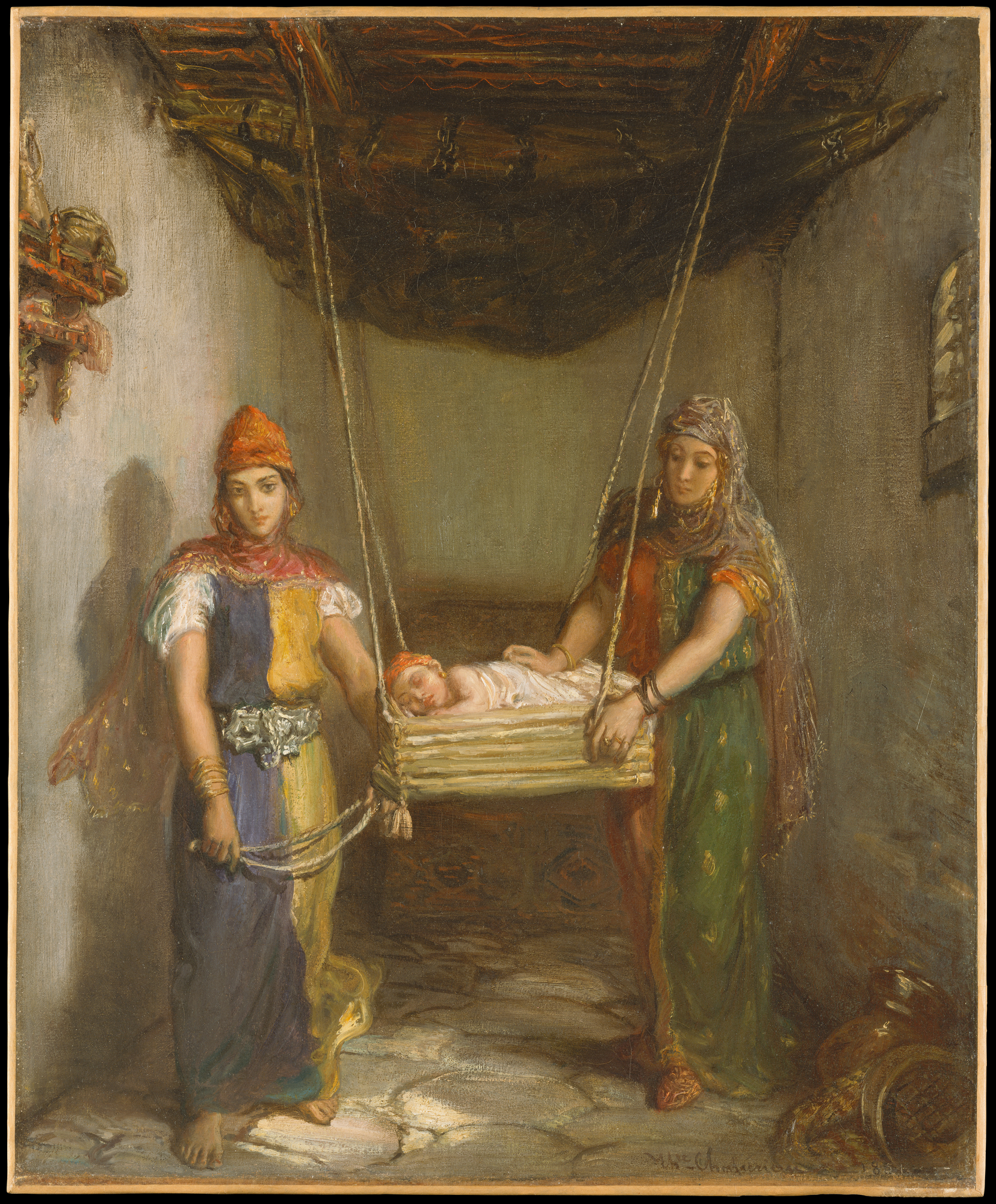
Jewish women in Constantine, Algeria (1851), by Théodore Chassériau, Metropolitan Museum of Art

== Jewish artistic and craft traditions ==
Algeria's Jewish communities, present in the region since antiquity and considerably reinforced by refugees from the Iberian Peninsula after 1492, developed distinct artistic and craft traditions that were deeply woven into the broader visual culture of the country, particularly in urban centers such as Algiers, Constantine, Oran, and Tlemcen.

Ceremonial and religious art. As in other Jewish communities, ritual objects for synagogue and home use: Torah crowns (ketarim), Torah cases and finials, Torah pointers, Hanukkah lamps, spice boxes, and Kiddush cups. were commissioned in precious metals and represent a significant body of Algerian Jewish decorative art. Algerian and wider Maghrebi silver Torah ornaments, often worked in repoussé and filigree, are held in Judaica collections internationally, including large 19th-century silver Torah crowns attributed to Algeria. Synagogue interiors, such as the historic synagogues of Constantine and Algiers, combined Ottoman- and Moorish-influenced decorative schemes with specifically Jewish liturgical furnishings.

Jewelry and silverwork. Jewish silversmiths and jewelers were prominent, and in some towns dominant, practitioners of the Maghrebi tradition of silver jewelry-making, producing pieces — bracelets, headdresses, and ceremonial bridal jewelry — worn by both Jewish and Muslim women across the region; the craft traditions of Algerian Jewish and Muslim silversmiths were closely related and often shared workshops, techniques, and motifs, including filigree, granulation, niello, and enamel work, and the use of coral and semi-precious stones.

Dress and material culture. Jewish women's traditional festive dress in cities such as Algiers, including elaborate embroidered garments and the tall ceremonial headdress known as the sarma (distinguished from Muslim women's headdresses chiefly by the use of a black rather than colored scarf), became recurring subjects of nineteenth-century European painting and photography of Algeria. Because it was socially and religiously restricted for European artists to portray Muslim women, Jewish women were frequently sought out as models by Orientalist painters and sculptors working in and on Algeria, including works such as Louis Roguin's studies of Algerian Jewish women and Charles Cordier's sculpted bust Jewish Woman of Algiers (1862).

Modern participation in the arts. Under French rule, and especially after the Crémieux Decree of 1870 granted French citizenship to Algeria's Jews, rising access to French education opened new paths into literature, the liberal professions, and the arts for members of the community, and a number of Algerian-born Jewish writers, poets, and visual artists such as the poet Sadia Lévy (1875–1951), born in the Oran region (trained or worked partly in mainland France. The 1962 independence of Algeria and the accompanying exodus of the great majority of Algeria's Jewish population. alongside most of the European (pied-noir) community) brought this long chapter of Algerian Jewish artistic life in the country itself largely to a close, with its heritage subsequently documented and preserved chiefly through diaspora institutions, museums, and private collections in France and Israel.

== Colonial-era painting (19th–early 20th century) ==
The French conquest of Algeria, beginning in 1830, brought a wave of European painters, many working in an Orientalist mode that depicted Algerian landscapes, architecture, and inhabitants for European audiences. In the 1880s, the first fine-art school on the European model was founded in Algiers; it trained European settler artists and was not designed to cultivate or train a modern Algerian artistic community, so that its role was chiefly that of a reference institution and repository for French and other European Orientalist art, most of which today forms a major part of Algeria's national art museum collections.

== Modern and contemporary Algerian art ==
Algerian art history is generally considered to have entered a distinctly modern phase with Mohamed Racim (1896–1975), who, together with his brother Omar Racim, led a revival of Islamic-influenced miniature painting in the early twentieth century, reworking a historic manuscript tradition into a modern national idiom. Painters such as Azouaou Mammeri, Abdelhalim Hemche, and Mohamed Temmam, working from the 1920s onward, are counted among further pioneers of a self-consciously Algerian modern painting.

A more decisively modern generation, born in the 1920s and 1930s and often trained partly in Paris after the Second World War, is generally regarded as the true founders of Algerian modern art. Central figures include:

- Baya (Fatma Haddad, 1931–1998), a self-taught painter and ceramist whose brightly colored, dreamlike compositions of women, animals, and plants brought her early international recognition, including exhibition in Paris in the late 1940s.
- Mohammed Khadda (1930–1991), a leading figure of the "École du Signe" ("School of the Sign"), who incorporated forms derived from Tifinagh (the traditional Berber script) and Arabic calligraphy into abstract compositions.
- Abdallah Benanteur (1931–2017) and Abdelkader Guermaz (1919–1996), painters associated with lyrical and gestural abstraction who spent much of their careers in France while remaining central reference points for Algerian modern art.
- Rachid Koraïchi (born 1947), a multidisciplinary artist known for large-scale work incorporating calligraphy, textiles, and ceramics.

In 1967, a group of younger Algerian artists in Algiers formed the Aouchem ("tattoo") collective, whose members explicitly drew on Berber symbolism, Saharan rock art, and traditional tattoo motifs as a source for a postcolonial, non-Western-derived Algerian art, active until 1971.

Later generations of Algerian artists have worked across painting, photography, video, installation, and mixed media, often engaging with themes of memory, colonial history, the Algerian War, exile, and gender. Contemporary artists with significant international profiles include Zineb Sedira (photography and video), Kader Attia (installation and sculpture), Katia Kameli, Lydia Ourahmane, Zoulikha Bouabdellah, Samta Benyahia, and Houria Niati, several of whom work largely between Algeria and Europe. Algerian women artists have been especially prominent in contemporary practice, including photographers such as Zohra Bensemra and multidisciplinary artists such as Fatma Zohra Zamoum and Amina Zoubir.

Since Algerian independence in 1962, the state has supported the arts through institutions such as the National Museum of Fine Arts (Musée national des beaux-arts d'Alger), one of the largest art museums in Africa, and through art schools and cultural policy, even as many prominent Algerian artists have continued to live and exhibit primarily abroad, particularly in France.

== See also ==
- Architecture of Algeria
- Culture of Algeria
- History of the Jews in Algeria
- Tassili n'Ajjer
- List of Algerian women artists
- Aouchem
