= List of Algerian artists =

This is a list of notable artists from, or associated with, Algeria.

== A ==
- Adel Abdessemed (born 1971)

== B ==
- Baya (1931–1998)
- Souhila Belbahar (1934–2023)
- Hacène Benaboura (1898–1960)
- Nadia Benbouta (born 1970)
- Zohra Bensemra (born 1968)
- Ahmed Benyahia (born 1943)
- Racim Benyahia (born 1987)
- Samta Benyahia (born 1950)
- Zaida Ben-Yusuf (1869–1933)
- Zoulikha Bouabdellah (born 1977)

== D ==
- Mohamed Demagh (1930-2018)

== F ==
- Omar Fetmouche (born 1955)
- Ceet Fouad (born 1971)

== H ==
- Khaled Habib (born 1970)
- Mimi Hafida (born 1965)
- Abdelkhader Houamel (1936–2018)

== I ==
- M'hamed Issiakhem (1928–1985)

== K ==
- Mohammed Khadda (1930–1991)
- Rachid Koraïchi (born 1947)

== M ==
- Cherif Merzouki (1951–1991)
- Rachid Mouffouk (born 1955)

== N ==
- Nahla El Fatiha Naili (born 1986)
- Houria Niati (born 1948)

== O ==
- Driss Ouadahi (born 1959)

== R ==
- Mohammed Racim (1896–1975)
- Omar Racim (1884–1959)

== T ==
- Mohamed Temam (1915–1988)

== Y ==
- Bachir Yellès (1921–2022)

== Z ==
- Rezki Zerarti (1938–2024)
- Hocine Ziani (born 1953)
- Amina Zoubir (born 1983)
