= List of Algerian women artists =

This is a list of female artists who were born in Algeria or whose artwork is closely associated with that country.

== B ==
- Baya (1931–1998), painter, ceramist
- Souhila Belbahar (1934-2023), painter
- Myriam Ben (1928–2001), writer, painter
- Zaida Ben-Yusuf (1869–1933), photographer
- Nadia Benbouta (born 1970), artist, combines unrelated elements
- Zohra Bensemra (born 1968), photographer
- Samta Benyahia (born 1950), plastic artist
- Zoulikha Bouabdellah (born 1977), plastic artist, videographer

== H ==
- Aïcha Haddad (1937–2005), visual artist
- Mimi Hafida (active since 2010), poet, visual artist
- Bettina Heinen-Ayech (1937–2020), painter

== K ==
- Katia Kameli (born 1973), visual artist

== N ==
- Houria Niati (born 1948), installation artist

== O ==
- Lydia Ourahmane (born 1992), visual and sound artist

== S ==
- Zineb Sedira (born 1963), photographer and video artist

== Z ==
- Fatma Zohra Zamoum (born 1967), writer, filmmaker and educator
- Amina Zoubir (born 1983), contemporary artist, filmmaker
