= List of pieds-noirs =

This is a list of notable pieds-noirs (French: [pje nwaʁ]; lit. 'black feet'), a term referring to French citizens who lived in French Algeria before independence, from 1830 to 1962. Specifically, pieds-noirs include those of European settlers descent from France or other European countries (such as Spain, Italy and Malta), who were born in Algeria.

== French Algeria (1830–1962) ==
- Louis Althusser, philosopher
- André Ascencio, footballer
- Jacques Attali, economist and political adviser
- Michele Audin, mathematician and writer
- Daniel Auteuil, actor and director
- Jean-Marc Aveline, Archbishop of Marseille
- Édouard-Henri Avril, painter and illustrator
- Jean-Pierre Bacri, actor
- Guy Bedos, comedian
- Paul Belmondo, sculptor
- Pierre Bensusan, guitarist
- Fernand Bonnier de La Chapelle, resistant
- Patrick Bruel, singer
- Albert Camus, philosopher
- Marie Cardinal, writer
- Léon Cauvy, painter
- Marcel Cerdan, boxer
- Alain Chabat, comedian
- Hélène Cixous, philosopher
- Claude Cohen-Tannoudji, physicist (Nobel Prize winner 1997)
- Étienne Daho, singer
- Jacques Derrida, philosopher
- Marcel Deviq, engineer, businessman and politician
- Julien Dray, politician
- Edwige Fenech, actress
- Louis Franchet d'Espèrey, soldier
- Dinh Gilly, operatic baritone
- José Gonzalez (French politician), politician
- Roger Hanin, actor
- Marlène Jobert, actress
- Edmond Jouhaud, soldier
- Alphonse Juin, soldier
- Gaston Julia, mathematician
- Bernard-Henri Lévy, philosopher and public intellectual
- Enrico Macias, singer
- Jean Pélégri, writer
- Michèle Perret, linguistics professor and writer of fiction
- Polaire (Émilie Marie Bouchaud), actress and singer
- Paul Quilès, politician
- Stéphane Rambaud, politician
- Emmanuel Roblès, writer
- Beatrice Romand, actress
- Yves Saint Laurent, designer
- Jean Sénac, poet
- Benjamin Stora, historian
- François Valéry, singer
- Alexandre Villaplane, footballer and Nazi collaborator
- Zouzou, model and singer

== French protectorate of Morocco (1912–1956) ==
- Jean-Paul Bertrand-Demanes, footballer
- Frida Boccara, singer
- Laurence de Cambronne, journalist
- Jean-Charles de Castelbajac, designer
- Nathalie Delon, actress and model
- Just Fontaine, footballer
- Roland Giraud, actor
- Élisabeth Guigou, politician
- Michel Jobert, politician
- Jean-Luc Mélenchon, politician
- Macha Méril, actress
- Philippe Morillon, military
- Daniel Pennac, writer
- Nessim Sibony, mathematician
- Dominique de Villepin, politician
- Jean Reno, actor

== French protectorate of Tunisia (1881–1956) ==
- Serge Adda, businessman
- Loris Azzaro, designer
- Claude Bartolone, politician
- Serge Bramly, writer
- Claudia Cardinale, actress
- Paul Chemla, bridge player
- Pierre Darmon, tennis player
- Bertrand Delanoë, politician
- Élie Lellouche, horse trainer
- Pierre Lellouche, politician
- Albert Memmi, writer
- Nine Moati, writer
- Serge Moati, journalist
- Edgard Pisani, politician
- Jean Sassi, military
- Philippe Séguin, politician
- Joseph Sitruk, rabbi
- Georges Wolinski, cartoonist
