= Naget Khadda =

Algerian academic

Naget Belkaïd-Khadda
- ناجت بلقائد خدة
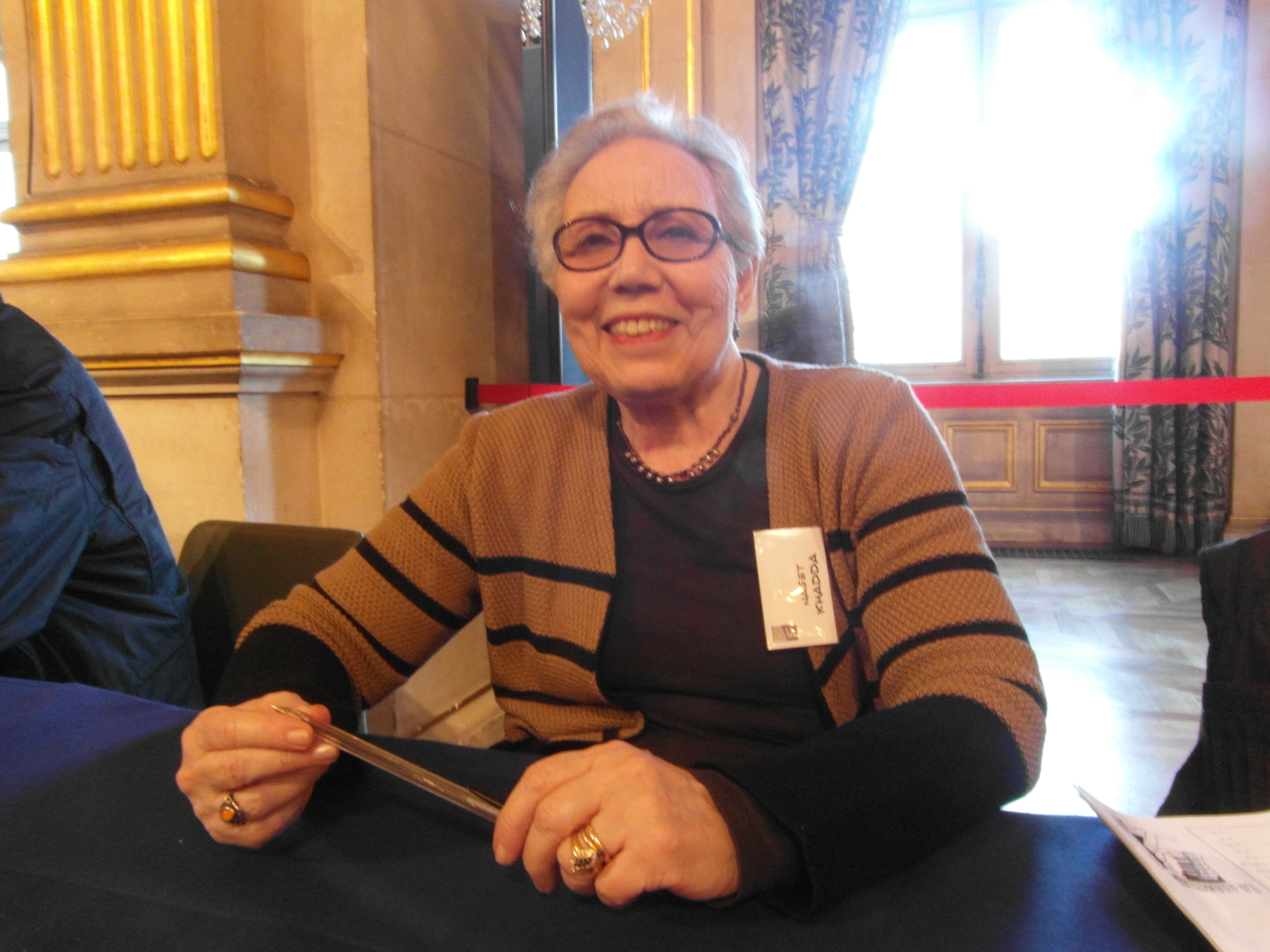
- Belkaïd-Khadda in 2015
- Born: Naget Belkaïd; Tlemcen, Algeria
- Education: Sorbonne Nouvelle University Paris 3 (PhD)
- Occupations: Academic, literary critic, researcher
- Years active: 1980–present
- Works: Écrivains maghrébins & modernité textuelle, Mohammed Dib, 50 ans d’écriture
- Spouse: Mohammed Khadda
- Website: casbah-editions.com

Signature
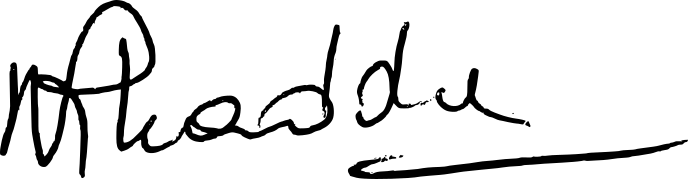

Naget Belkaïd-Khadda, also known as Naget Khadda, is an Algerian academic and scholar specializing in French and Maghrebi literature. She has taught French and Maghrebi literatures at the University of Algiers, Paris 8 University, and Paul Valéry University, Montpellier 3.

== Academic career and research ==
Belkaïd-Khadda holds a doctorate in Arabic-Islamic studies from Sorbonne Nouvelle University Paris 3 (1987) Her research focuses on literary criticism and the analysis of works by Algerian writers of French expression, particularly Mohammed Dib, Kateb Yacine, Mouloud Mammeri, Mouloud Feraoun, Assia Djebar, Rachid Boudjedra, Nabil Farès, and Habib Tengour.

She has supervised several doctoral dissertations, including that of Mohamed Ismail Abdoun on Henri Michaux and Kateb Yassine (University of Algiers, 2004), and that of Elke Richter on Assia Djebar, co-directed with Elisabeth Arend at Paul Valéry University, Montpellier 3.

Her research also addresses sociocultural issues related to Algerian literature written in French and to Arab literature written in the same language.

== Cultural activities ==
In 1968, Belkaïd met the painter Mohammed Khadda (1930–1991), whom she later married. She collaborated closely with him throughout his career, contributing to the interpretation and promotion of his work through both writing and organization.

Belkaïd-Khadda has helped organize numerous exhibitions of Khadda's artwork, including at the Institut du monde arabe (IMA) in 1996, the National Museum of Fine Arts of Algiers, and the Algerian Cultural Center in Paris. She also works to preserve and promote his artistic legacy through the creation of a Mohammed Khadda museum in partnership with the Algerian Ministry of Culture.

== Engagements and positions ==
After her retirement from academia, Belkaïd-Khadda became more active in Algeria's cultural sphere. She continues to take part in colloquia, deliver lectures, and serve on literary juries, including for the Mohammed Dib Literary Prize and the Assia Djebar Prize for the Novel.

In March 2022, she was honored by the Institut du monde arabe as part of the IMA Chair's program on Arab women engaged in intellectual and cultural life.

== Publications ==
Belkaïd-Khadda is the author of numerous books, monographs, and scholarly articles, including:

- Alger, une ville et ses discours. Actes du colloque, Montpellier, 5–6 avril 1996. Université Paul-Valéry. 2000. ISBN 9782842690014.
- Écrivains maghrébins & modernité textuelle, L’Harmattan, 2000. ISBN 2738429408
- Nedroma au long cours, 2009. ISBN 9789961648575
- Charlot, l’homme-roi, 2015. ISBN 9782357800632
- Kateb Yacine – Une vie, une œuvre, IMA, 2019. ISBN 9789920627450
- Mohammed Dib, 50 ans d’écriture, Université Paul-Valéry Montpellier, 2002. ISBN 9782842695507
- Bachir Hadj Ali: Poétique et politique (ed.), 2000.
- Défis démocratiques et affirmation nationale: Algeria, 1900–1962 (with Afifa Bererhi, Christian Phéline, and Agnès Spiquel), Chihab Éditions, 2016. ISBN 9789947394670
- La bataille de Constantine 1836–1837 (co-compiler), 2016. ISBN 9947391159
- Le théâtre des genres dans l'œuvre de Mohammed Dib (co-edited with Charles Bonn and Mounira Chatti), Presses universitaires de Rennes, 2023. ISBN 9782753593107

=== Selected articles ===
- “Mohammed Dib, le Tlemcénien,” Horizons Maghrébins, nos. 37–38, 1999.
- “Champ culturel algérien: le basculement des années 1950 et ses enjeux,” Recherches Internationales, nos. 67–68, 2003.
- “Dib, Mohammed (1920–2003),” in Dictionnaire des écrivains algériens de langue française de 1990 à 2010, Chihab Éditions, 2014.
