= Zoubir =

Zoubir is an Arabic masculine given name and surname.

== Last name ==
- Abdellah Zoubir (born 1991), French association football player
- Amina Zoubir (born 1983), Algerian contemporary artist and filmmaker
- Sofia Karlberg Zoubir (born 1996), Swedish singer

== First name ==
- Zoubir Bachi (born 1950), Algerian association football player
- Zoubir Ouasti (born 1981), Algerian association football player
- Zoubir Zmit (born 1975), Algerian association football player
