= Omar Fetmouche =

Algerian artist

- عمر فطموش
- Born: 27 April 1955 (age 71); Bordj Menaïel, Algeria
- Education: University of Algiers
- Known for: Artist, actor, playwright
- Notable work: Theatrical plays
- Website: Omar Fetmouche on Facebook

Omar Fetmouche (Arabic: عمر فطموش) (born in Bordj Menaïel on 27 April 1955) is an Algerian artist, actor and playwright.

== Early life ==
Fetmouche was born in 1955 in the town of Bordj Menaïel in lower Kabylia, and after having done his basic studies in his hometown.

He attended the University of Algiers where he obtained a license in French before he registered for a Magister's degree in French literature.

== Career ==
Fetmouche began his artistic career with the creation in 1976 at Bordj Menaïel of the Menaïli theatrical movement within the framework of amateur theater.

Faced with the success of his theatrical troupe, he created in 1982 a popular drama school in Bordj Menaïel to channel the enthusiasm of young people towards the dramatic art.

The apotheosis of his artistic movement was crowned in 1990 when he created the artistic company "Sindjab" in his hometown.

His artistic success led him to be elected in 1998 as secretary general of the Algerian network of the International Institute of Mediterranean Theater.

In front of the proven professionalism of Fetmouche, he was appointed in August 2004 as head of the regional theater of Béjaïa at the level of the Anna Lindh Euro-Mediterranean Foundation for the Dialogue Between Cultures.

Fetmouche was a member of the jury for the 42nd edition of the National Amateur Theater Festival of Mostaganem held in June 2009.

He was part of an artistic commission called "Network-Passerelles" formed by academics and critics of the performing arts, and led open debates during the 47th National Amateur Theater Festival of Mostaganem organized in May 2014.

He was one of the members of the organizing committee of the 9th Arab Theater Festival which took place in January 2017 in Oran and Mostaganem.

Fetmouche participated with the Sinjab troupe in the 14th National Professional Theater Festival (FNTP) organized in March 2021 at the Algerian National Theater Mahieddine Bachtarzi (TNA) in Algiers.

== Theatrical plays ==
During his artistic career, Fetmouche wrote several theatrical plays, including:

- Tahmouna (Arabic: اتهمونا) (1977).
- Setta ou Damma (Arabic: ستة ودامة) (1982).
- Harf B'harf (Arabic: حرف بحرف) (1986).
- Hzam El Ghoula (Arabic: حزام الغولة) (1988).
- Rdjal Ya Hlalef (Arabic: رجال يا حلالف) (1989).
- D'miki y a Oueld d'Afrique (Arabic: دميكي يا ولاد دافريك) (1989).
- Aouicha Ouel Heraz (Arabic: عويشة والحراز) (1991).
- Allam El Baouche (Arabic: عالم البعوش) (1993).
- The wounded smile (Arabic: البسمة المجروحة) (1994).
- Yasmine (Arabic: ياسمين) (1996).
- Fatma N'Soumer (Arabic: فاطمة نسومر) (2004).
- Wouhouche.com (Arabic: وحوش.كوم) (2006).
- Ayla Hamla (Arabic: عايلة هاملة) (2006).
- Le Fleuve détourné (2007).
- Akher Saa (Arabic: آخر ساعة) (2009).
- Les vigiles (2009).
- Saha l'artiste (2019).
- Sinistri (Arabic: سينيستري).
- Muhand u Chaavan (Arabic: محند أوشعبان).
- Uzzu n'Tayri (Arabic: أوزو نطايري).
- Timiqwa n'Tmuchuha (Arabic: تيميقوى نتموشوها).
- Akin Ilbhar (Arabic: آكين إيلبحر).
- Urgagh Mmuthagh (Arabic: أورقاغ مموثاغ).
- The Alpine föhn (French: Le Fœhn).
- The unreason (French: La Déraison).
- Leonardo Fibonacci.
- The True Force (French: La Vraie Force).
- The Memorandum (French: Le Rapport).

== Awards ==
Fetmouche has been awarded for its artistic productions in several festivals:

- The first prize of the theater festival of Mostaganem in 1982.
- Prize for the best text for the play Wouhouche.com in 2005.

== See also ==
- List of Algerians
- List of Algerian artists
- List of Algerian writers

== Bibliography ==
- Pierre Laville (1995). L'année du théâtre: 1994/1995. Sand. p. 397. ISBN 9782710705499.
- Noi donne. Cooperativa Libera Stampa. 1996. p. 72.
- Kamal Salhi (1998). African Theatre for Development: Art for Self-determination. Intellect Books. p. 417. ISBN 9781871516777.
- La pensée de midi, Numéros 1 à 3. Actes Sud. 2000. p. 107.
- Algérie 99: chronologie illustrée. Editions Le Matin. 2000. p. 30. ISBN 9789941854019.
- Bouziane Ben Achour (2002). Le théâtre en mouvement: octobre 88 à ce jour. Dar El Gharb. p. 71;148;151. ISBN 9789961542040.
- Ali Hefied (2003). Regard sur le théâtre algérien. Casbah Éditions. p. 213. ISBN 9789961643969.
- Achour Cheurfi (2004). Ecrivains algériens: dictionnaire biographique. Casbah Éditions. p. 167. ISBN 9789961643983.
- Arezki Metref (2005). Kabylie story. Editions Casbah. pp. 26–28.
- Laura Chakravarty Box (2005). Strategies of Resistance in the Dramatic Texts of North African Women: A Body of Words. Routledge. p. 213. ISBN 9781135932060.
- Meridians: Feminism, Race, Transnationalism, Volumes 6 à 7. Wesleyan University Press. 2005. p. 85;91.
- Ahmed Cheniki (2006). Vérités du théâtre en Algérie. Dar El Gharb. p. 196;209;237. ISBN 9789961540466.
- Achour Cheurfi (2007). L'encyclopédie maghrébine. Casbah Éditions. p. 436;439. ISBN 9789961646410.
- Mohammed Habib Samrakandi (2008). Le théâtre arabe au miroir de lui-même et son contact avec les créations des deux rives de la Méditerranée. Presses Universitaires du Mirail. p. 24. ISBN 9782858169771.
- Primer acto, Numéros 322 à 324. 2008. p. 179;188.
- Institut de recherches et d'études sur le monde arabe et musulman (2008). L'année du Maghreb. CNRS Éditions. p. 170.
- Abraka Humanities Review, Volume 6, Numéro 1. Ababa Press. 2014. p. 140.
