= Jean Pélégri =

French writer and academic (1920–2003)

- Born: 20 June 1920; Rovigo, French Algeria
- Died: 24 September 2003 (aged 83); Paris, France
- Occupations: Author, Professor

Signature
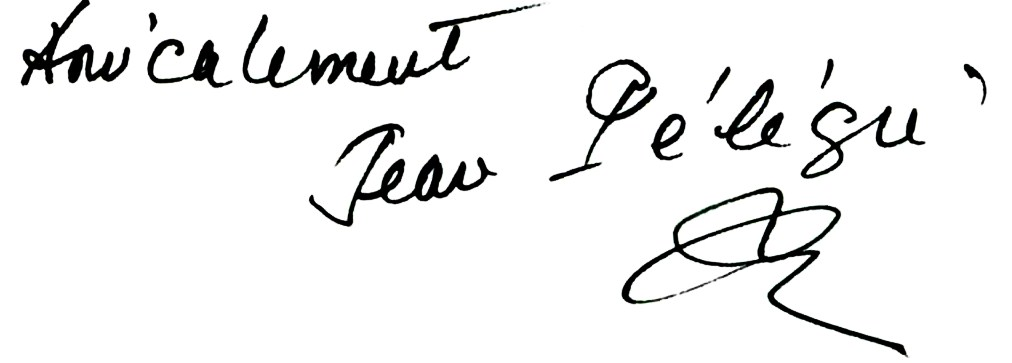

Jean Pélégri (20 June 1920 – 24 September 2003) was a writer and professor of literature. Of French descent, he was born in Algeria, but left as part of the diaspora of French colonists referred to as pieds-noirs following the Algerian War.

He was a friend of many Algerian writers (such as Mohammed Dib and Kateb Yacine) and, like Jean Sénac, Pélégri considered himself to be one of them; he always saw himself as an "Algerian at heart". He supplemented his novels' prefaces with artwork from his painter friends Baya, Abdallah Benanteur, Mohammed Khadda and Jean de Maisonseul. Pélégri also assisted on the film adaptation of his novel Les Oliviers de la justice as screenwriter, dialogue writer and actor. The movie won the Cinema and Television Writers Award at the 1962 Cannes Film Festival.

== Reviews ==
"Jean Pélégri, Algerian by birth and one of the great writers of our time, greater than Albert Camus in any case, remains unknown in France. Why? Because he tried so hard to mark his territory as an Algerian that he created a different kind of French language just for his own use. And for that, French readers rejected him."

Mohammed Dib, Simorgh, Albin Michel, Paris, 2003 [his last book].

"No French writer from Algeria, the 'pieds-noirs' as we ignorantly call them, with the possible exception of the poet Jean Sénac, accepted Algeria completely for what she is and for what she has always been the way that he did. No one so naturally felt like a son of Algeria in all her forms: Arab, Berber, Spanish, French ... as Jean Pélégri did, not Gabriel Audisio, not Emmanuel Roblès, not Jules Roy, nor Albert Camus. From his novel Oliviers de la justice to Maboul, Pélégri sings a veritable 'cante jondo' of rural Algeria in all of its baroque complexity. With Kateb Yacine's Nedjma, Le Maboul is the only Faulknerian novel of our literature."

Jean Daniel, Pélégri l'Algérien, Le Nouvel Observateur, 2–8 October 2003.

== Novels and Plays ==
- L'Embarquement du lundi, Éditions Gallimard, 1952.
- Les Oliviers de la justice, Gallimard, 1959. Grand prix catholique de littérature 1960
- Le Maboul, Gallimard, 1963.
- L'Homme-caillou, Abdallah Benanteur, 1965.
- Les Monuments du déluge, Christian Bourgois, 1967.
- Slimane (pièce en quatre actes), Christian Bourgois, 1968.
- L'Homme mangé par la ville (radio drama), France Culture, 1970.
- Le Cheval dans la ville, Gallimard, 1972.
- Le Maître du Tambour (play), Théâtre Jean Vilar, Suresnes, 1974.
- Ma mère, l'Algérie, Laphomic, Algiers, 1989; Actes Sud, 1990 (ISBN 286869554X).
- Les Étés perdus, Éditions du Seuil, 1999 (ISBN 2020367580).

== About Jean Pélégri ==
- Jean Pélégri, in Algérie Littérature/Action n° 29, Editions Marsa, March 1999.
- Dominique Le Boucher, Jean Pélégri l'Algérien ou Le scribe du caillou, with unpublished texts by Jean Pélégri, two volumes, Algérie Littérature/Action n°37-38, Editions Marsa, 2000 (ISBN 2913868118).
- Dominique Le Boucher, Les deux Jean; Jean Sénac, l'homme soleil, Jean Pélégri, l'homme caillou (correspondence 1962-1973, poèmes inédits), Montpellier, Chèvre-feuille étoilée, et Alger, Barzakh, 2002 (ISBN 2914467052).
