= Mohamed Ismail Abdoun =

Algerian academic (born 1945)

- Born: 1945 (age 80–81); Béchar, Algeria
- Occupations: Academic, literary critic
- Known for: Research and teaching in comparative literature and poetic criticism

Academic background
- Education: University of Algiers 2 (PhD)
- Thesis: Pour une poétique de la dissidence [ressource textuelle, sauf manuscrits]: Henri Michaux et Kateb Yassine - Essaie de poétique comparée (2004)
- Doctoral advisor: Naget Khadda

Academic work
- Discipline: Literature

Mohamed Ismail Abdoun (born 1945) is an Algerian academic and literary critic. He is the author of a doctoral dissertation devoted to a poetics of dissidence in the works of Henri Michaux and Kateb Yacine. His research focuses on comparative literature and poetic criticism.

== Biography ==
Mohamed Ismail Abdoun obtained a PhD in French and Comparative Literature from University of Algiers 2 in 2004, under the supervision of Naget Khadda. His work explores the notion of "dissidence" in literature, applied to writers such as Henri Michaux and Kateb Yacine, as well as to other Maghrebi and European authors.

== Work and contributions ==
Abdoun develops a comparative approach to the theme of dissidence, bridging French and Algerian literatures. He has published critical studies on Henri Michaux and Kateb Yacine (ANEP Editions, 2003–2004). His thesis is considered a reference in the comparative study of poetic writings of exile, revolt, and transgression.

== Bibliography ==
- Pour une poétique de la dissidence : Henri Michaux et Kateb Yacine – Essai de poétique comparée, doctoral thesis, University of Algiers 2, 2004, 127 p.
- Lecture de Michaux : angoisse et évasion, Algiers, ANEP, 2003.
- Lecture de Kateb Yacine, Algiers, ANEP, 2004.
- Kateb, Yacine ; textes présentés par ABDOUN, Mohamed Ismail, Algiers/Paris, SNED – Fernand Nathan, 1979.
