= Mustapha Adane =

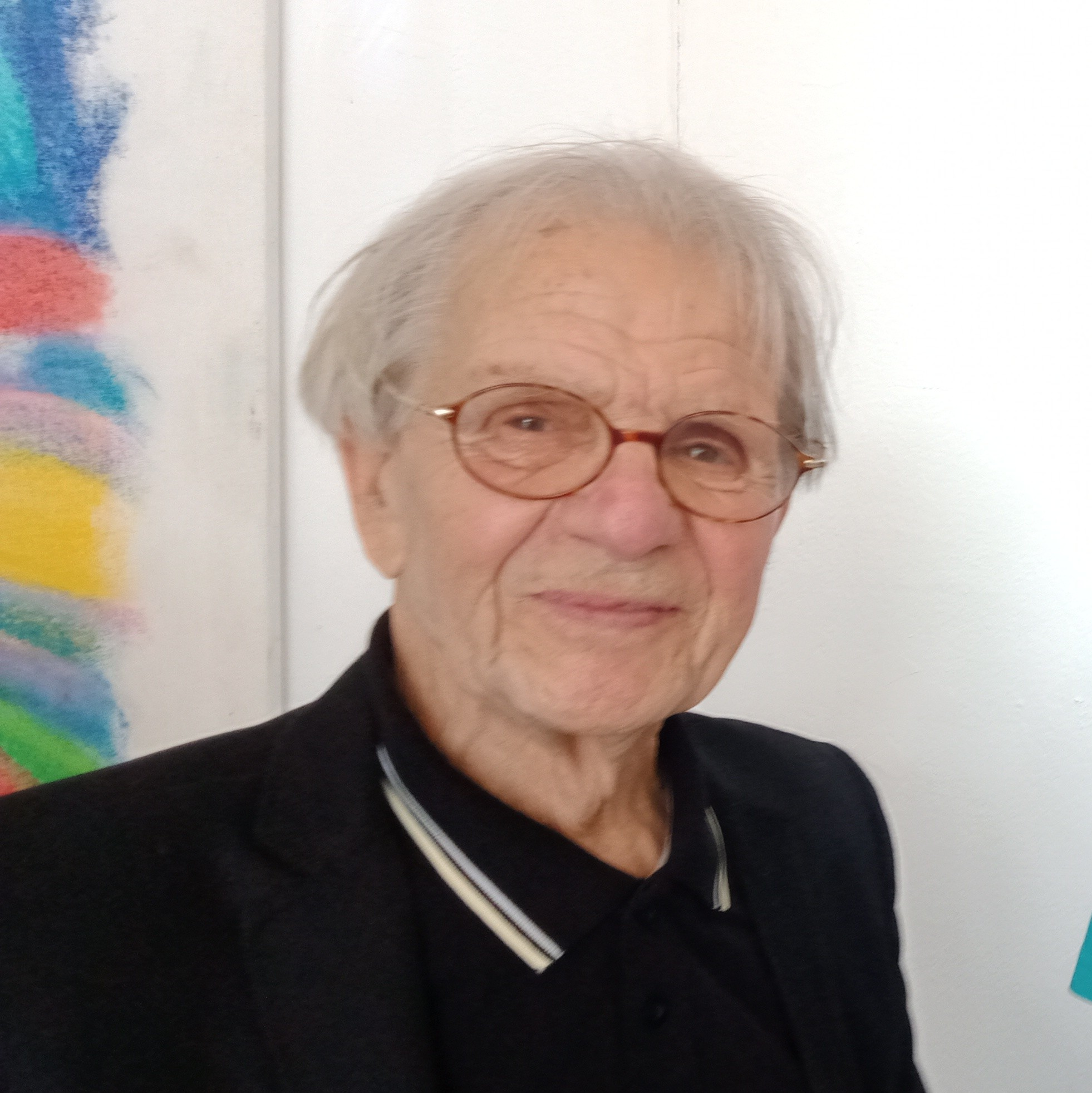
- Mustapha Adane at his exhibition at the Moufdi Zakaria Palace in 2022
- Born: Mustapha Adane; March 12, 1933 (age 93); Casbah of Algiers, Algeria
- Citizenship: Algerian
- Known for: Visual artist (painter, ceramist, sculptor), designer, engraver, interior architect, restorer
- Notable work: Tifinagh, Casbah, Tassili, Profil de jeune fille, La Machine
- Movement: Aouchem (founded in 1967)

Signature
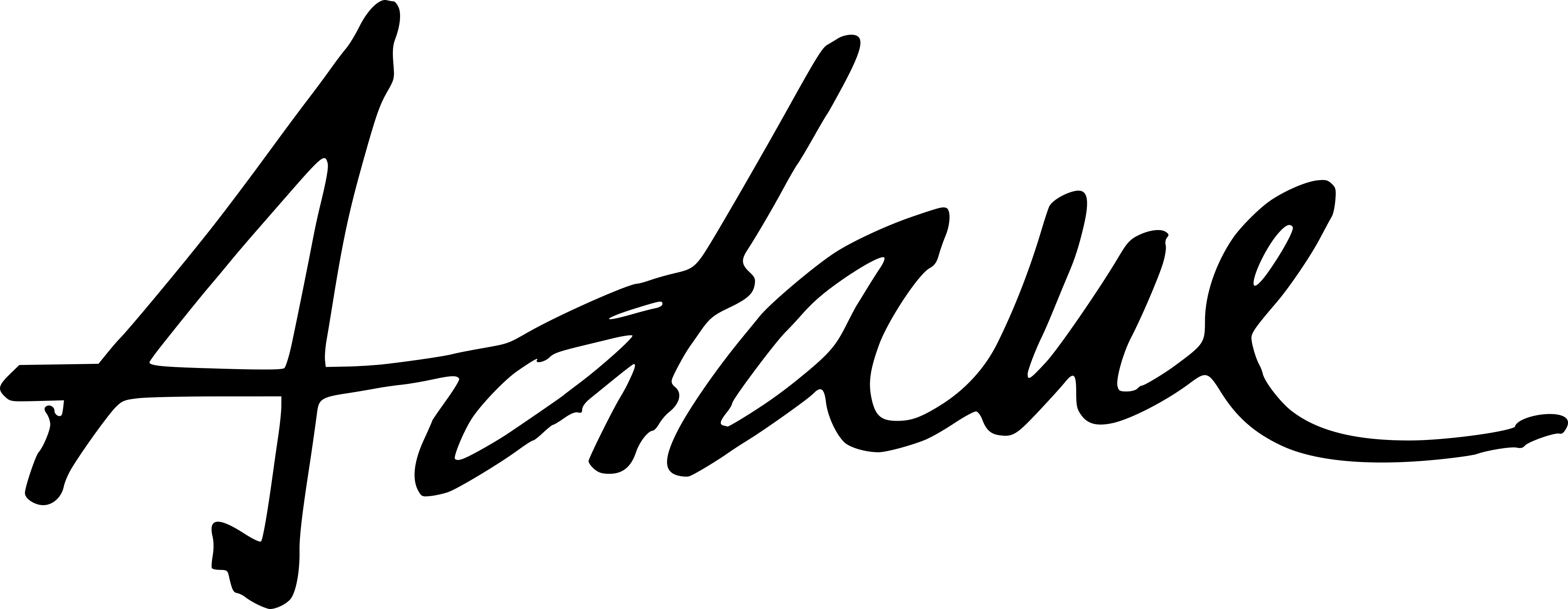

Mustapha Adane (born March 12, 1933, in the Casbah of Algiers) is an Algerian visual artist known for his mastery of enamel on copper, his involvement in design, sculpture, restoration, and interior architecture, as well as his role in the Aouchem.

== Biography ==
Mustapha Adane was born on March 12, 1933 in the Casbah of Algiers. In 1960, he received a scholarship through UGEMA and the GPRA to pursue artistic studies in Leipzig, Germany. He graduated in 1965 with a university degree in art pedagogy, graphic design, and sculpture.

Upon returning to Algeria, he was appointed professor and assistant lecturer at the National School of Architecture and Fine Arts in Algiers. He also served as president of the National Union of Plastic Arts (UNAP) from 1967 to 1971.

Adane co-founded the "Aouchem" group (meaning “tattoo” or “sign”) in 1967, which promoted an art form rooted in traditional Algerian symbols and aesthetics.

== Artistic style ==
Adane’s works combine enamel, copper, and symbolic iconography inspired by Berber signs, Arabic calligraphy, and ancestral motifs. His approach is often described as a synthesis of modernist composition and traditional Algerian identity.

== Selected works ==
- Tifinagh — enamel on copper
- Casbah — enamel on copper
- Tassili — enamel on copper
- Profil de jeune fille
- La Machine

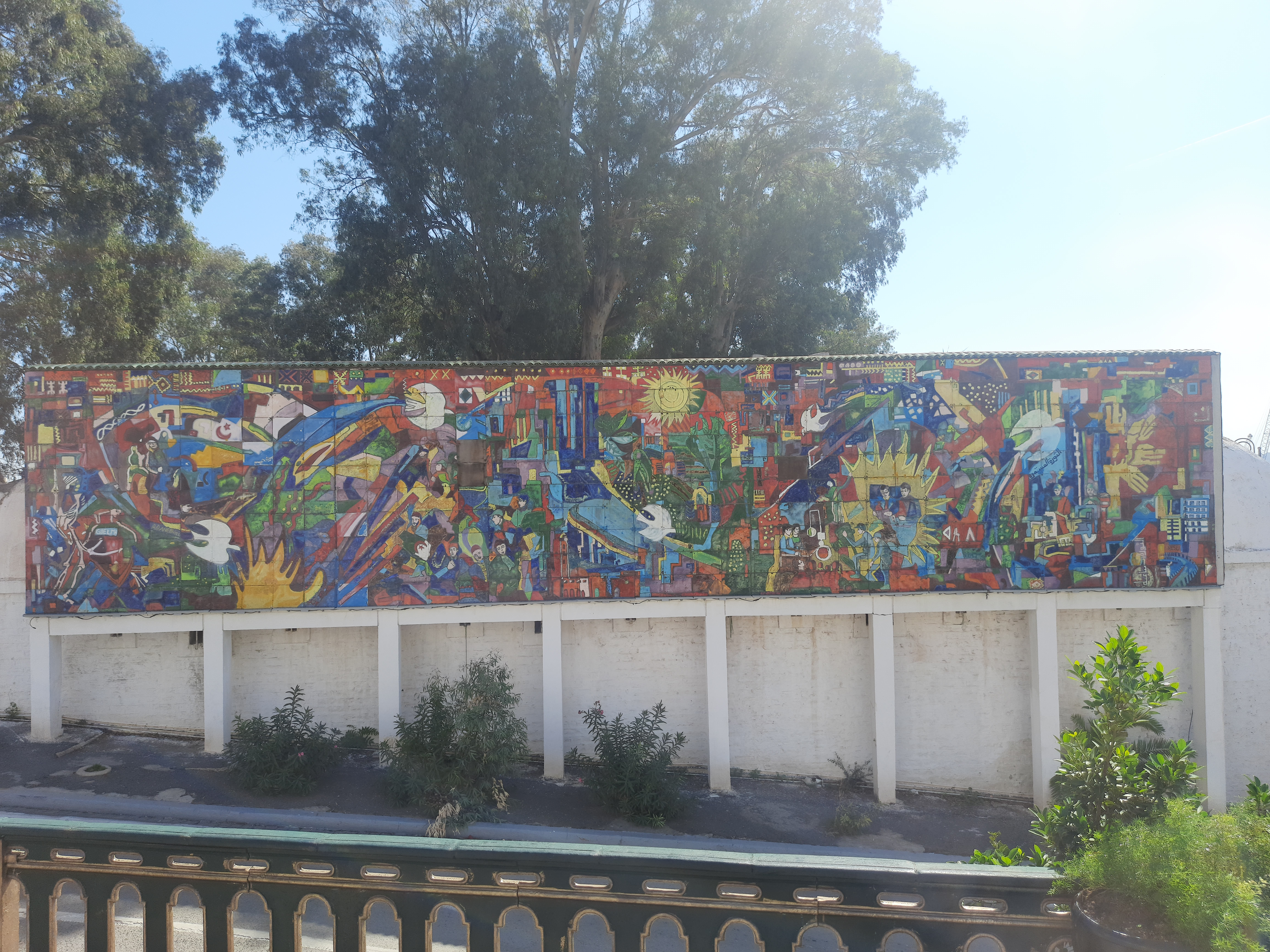
The Tafourah mural facing the Grande Poste of Algiers, created by Mustapha Adane

== Exhibitions ==
- Retrospective “60 years of creation” at the Bloom The Art Factory Gallery, Algiers – March–April 2021
- Exhibition at Galerie Baya, Palais de la Culture Moufdi Zakariya – 2022, with Moncef Gueta
