= Yossi Atia =

Israeli film director

- יוסי עטיה
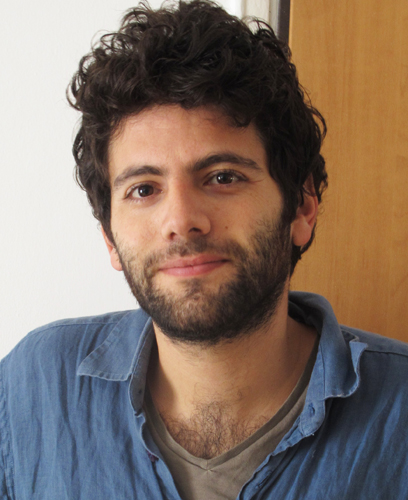
- Atia in 2013
- Born: 1979 (age 46–47); Jerusalem, Israel
- Education: Directing and Production, Sam Spiegel Film and Television School, Jerusalem (2004); BA in Literature, Tel Aviv University (2007); MFA in Directing and Production, Tel Aviv University (2010)
- Occupations: Film director; Video artist; Actor
- Known for: Satirical short films on social and political issues
- Notable work: Puddle (2010); Darfur (2008); Sherutrom (2006); The Memorial Day; Kids in War; Missiles on Tel Aviv; The Jewish-Arab State
- Awards: Jerusalem Pitch Point prize, Lia van Leer Fund (2015)

Yossi Atia (Hebrew: יוסי עטיה; born 1979) is an Israeli artist, active primarily as a film director, video artist, and actor.

== Biography ==
Yossi Atia was born in 1979, in Jerusalem, to a Sephardic Jewish family. Studied directing and production at the Sam Spiegel Film and Television School, Jerusalem (2004). Studied in Tel Aviv University, earned a BA in literature in 2007. Studied for his MFA in Directing and Production in Tel Aviv University's Film Department (2010). Graduated from Ruth Dytches workshop, acting for Television and Film (2010).

From 2005 to 2010, Atia created and acted, together with Itamar Rose, in twenty short films. These were satirical short movies on contentious social and political issues. Their movies aimed that people take a new look at their reality and at disturbing issues. Their movies deal with homosexuality, grief, rape, occupation, suicide bombing and the war in Lebanon. Their films were screened initially at coffee shops, bars, clubs and galleries. The films were screened in many museums and film festivals, including Pompidou Center, Paris; Tate Gallery, London; Rotterdam Film Festival; The Israeli Center for Digital Art, Holon; Herzliya Museum of Contemporary Art. In 2010. he created an Urban Comical Performance in Tel Aviv called "From a Fling to a Relationship".

In August 2012, Atia led a guided tour named “from trauma to fantasy", which was held as part of the cultural season in Jerusalem 4 times. The tour took place at Jerusalem's Jaffa Road following the footsteps of the Palestinian suicide bombings that had occurred in the area from 2000 to 2005. The tour was recorded for a film Atia is making. As of 2015, Atia is working on a movie titled Born in Jerusalem and Still Alive.

In 2015, he won the Jerusalem Pitch Point prize for his debut feature from Lia van Leer fund.

Atia lives and works in Tel Aviv.

== Selected works ==
- Puddle – 2010 – Short film (10 min.) directed by Yossi Atia. A young man at a Purim party gets a phone call that is going to ruin his night.
- Darfur – 2008 – Building a barbed wire fence on the beach at Bat Yam, Rose and Atia role-play with pedestrian passers-by. Some are disguised as Sudanese refugees trying to cross the border, while the others played the Israeli border sentries.
- Sherutrom – 2006 – The Sherutrom is the annual fundraising telethon for the IDF. The movie attempts to show how the IDF, which receives the largest funding in Israel's national economy, beg for alms from already downtrodden citizens.
- The Memorial Day – Atia and Rose offered citizens on the street the opportunity to commemorate themselves on video that would be broadcast in case they are killed in a terrorist attack.
- Kids in war – Filmed during the 2006 Lebanon War. Atia and Rose visited the seashore, disguised as children, and asked different people to play their parents. The "children" then asked them blunt and poignant questions about the reasons and justification of war.
- Missiles on Tel Aviv – In the 2006 Lebanon War, the Hezbollah launched missiles on central as well as northern Israel. Atia and Rose shot a news item as if a rocket had fallen in Tel Aviv. Their intent was to shoot the situation before it occurs and when the rocket lands they would add the rocket to the news item.
- The Jewish-Arab State – In 2020, the majority of Israel's citizens will be Arab. Atia and Rose went to Tayibe attempting to stage, with their Arab brethren, a vision of the unified Jewish-Arab State.
