= Racim Benyahia =

Algerian digital illustrator and cartoonist

Racim Bey Benyahia
- Born: 1 November 1987 (age 38); Constantine, Algeria
- Known for: Digital illustration, cartoonism

Benyahia Racim Bey (Arabic: بن يحيى رسيم باي; born in Constantine, Algeria, in 1987) is an Algerian digital illustrator and cartoonist.

Racim Benyahia is the winner of the 1st Prize for the Best Poster at the 5th International Festival of Comics of Algeria (2012).

He was also awarded the 3rd Prize at the 4th version of the same international festival in 2011.

== "Constantine 1836" ==
In 2017, at the "Maghreb des Livres" in Paris, an event of which he designed the official poster, Racim Benyahia presented his first comic book, "Constantine 1836" (Dalimen Editions, 2016), illustrating the first Battle of Constantine in 1836 featuring the resistance of Ahmed Bey against the colonial armies led by the Maréchal Clausel. The author insisted on the fact that although he added a personal touch, he remained as "faithful" as possible to the historical records related to this major battle in Algerian-French history.

== Artistic background and family ties ==
He is the son of Algerian artist Ahmed Benyahia, and nephew of Algerian French artist Samta Benyahia.

== External links and references ==
- (in Arabic) اختتام المهرجان الدولي الخامس للشريط المرسوم بالجزائر
- (in French) La BD dans la peau
- (in French) Dessine-moi mon Histoire !
- (in French) Une édition dédiée aux pionniers et aux nouveaux auteurs
- (in French) Résultats Concours Affiche
- (in French) Tomber de rideau et remise de prix
- (in French) Alger, bulles sans frontières
- (in French) 50 jours de formation BD, 5 albums nouveaux
- (in French) Cérémonie autour des lauréats 2012
