= Ahmed Benyahia =

Algerian artist

- Born: 11 May 1943 (age 82); Constantine, Algeria
- Known for: Painting, sculpting, acting
- Movement: Modernism, Post-Modernism

Ahmed Benyahia (Arabic: أحمد بن يحيى; born in Constantine, Algeria, on 11 May 1943) is an Algerian artist.

He is a notable alumnus of the École nationale supérieure des Beaux-Arts of Paris, where as a student in the late 1960s he played an instrumental role in successfully bringing French sculptor César Baldaccini as a Professor there, of whom he was to become a distinguished disciple and protégé.

Ahmed Benyahia is the brother of Algerian-French artist Samta Benyahia. and father of infographic artist and cartoonist Racim Benyahia.

He is also known for his acting roles in Algerian cinematographic works.

== Biography ==
Born on 11 May 1943, in what is today Chelghoum Laïd (formerly known as Châteaudun-du-Rhumel), Ahmed Benyahia received his early education there.

He then grew up at the Arbaïne Cherif, for long considered the intellectual hub of the city of Constantine, a short distance from the school of the famous Algerian polymath and reformist Ben Badis.

In 1957, while the apex of the Algerian War of Independence, at age 13, he joined Constantine's École municipale des Beaux-arts, then under French administration, which allowed him to teach painting, drawing, and history at the Hihi El Mekki High School in Kantara for a year.

After distinguishing himself at l'École nationale des beaux-arts in Algiers, where his works were featured on several major international events (such as, among others, the First International Forum of Algeria) in 1964, he moved to Paris, France, in 1966, where he was admitted to the École nationale supérieure des Beaux-Arts. In 1972, he was awarded the post of professor at the University of Constantine, and in 1977 exhibited his artworks in the city for the first time. Subsequently, he staged a series of exhibitions in France. While in Constantine, he was commissioned to design a building to commemorate the life of Algerian hero and martyr Zighoud Youcef, who died in 1956 at the age of 35, and the Guelma memorial, which commemorates the victims of the Sétif and Guelma massacre on 8 May 1945.

== Paris: bringing César to les Beaux-arts ==
Once he moved to Paris, France, Benyahia's artistic talent would not go unnoticed by French sculptor César, who joined the faculty of the prestigious École after a group of students headed by Ahmed urged him to become their Professor.

The board members of the École nationale initially refused to grant a professorship to César, but were subsequently forced to reconsider their stance due to the students' pressure.

Ahmed became the protégé of the renowned French artist. He is the brother and mentor of Samta Benyahia.

== Master and disciple: César and Ahmed Benyahia ==
Highly recommending the young Ahmed Benyahia to his friend, the architect Fernand Pouillon, César had this to say about his Algerian disciple:

The holder of this letter is Algerian and sculptor, I've known him for three years now. He has been from the outset among the students who came to look for me in order to be their Professor at les Beaux-Arts. He is an extremely talented gentleman. He possesses a mastery and a profound technical knowledge of all the media and means of sculptural expression. It is quite rare to meet in a young man of this age displaying such firmness and intransigence, a self-discipline so powerful when it comes to his artistic work. I ask you to help him fulfill himself, because he deserves it.

— Letter of César Baldaccini to Fernand Pouillon, cited in French in La Tribune, May 11, 2012.

== Yale University Conference on Ahmed Benyahia ==
On 18 March 2021, the work of Ahmed Benyahia was the subject of a noted conference given by distinguished University of California, Los Angeles Professor Susan Slymovics hosted by the MacMillan Center Council on Middle East Studies (CMES) of Yale University. Titled "Ahmed Benyahia, Artist: The Provenance of an Algerian Public Sculpture" , the lecture focused on the long and convoluted story of the artist's 1968 sculpture of Algeria hero and martyr Zighoud Youcef.

== Preserving the cultural heritage of Constantine ==
Ahmed Benyahia is also the founder and president of the Association for the Defense of the Old Rock of Constantine, which boasts a long history of striving for the preservation of the national heritage of the city of Constantine.

Thanks to the intense activism of the association headed by Ahmed Benyahia, a great number of monuments and landmarks dating back to the Phoenician, Roman, Ottoman, French era were saved from destruction, which was planned by the local authorities in order to initiate several new urban projects such as the construction of parking lots and tramway lines. Several of these monuments and landmarks were subsequently classified as UNESCO World Heritage Sites.

== Cinema Acting ==
Ahmed Benyahia is also known for portraying the role of Algerian nationalist militant Lamine Debaghine in the 2008 biographical movie of Algerian war hero and martyr Mostefa Ben Boulaïd, as well as in the 2014 biographical movie of Algerian independence leader Krim Belkacem, both by Algerian film director and screenwriter Ahmed Rachedi.

== Family ties ==
He is the brother of Samta Benyahia of whom he was the mentor for several years, as well as the brother of the late Doctor Azzouz Benyahia of Constantine, who was the target of a political assassination in the aftermath of the Algerian legislative elections of 1997.

He is the father of illustrator artist and cartoonist Racim Benyahia.

== Notable works ==
- Sculpture of the Emir Abdelkader, Mexico City, 1986
- Statue of the Military Academy of Cherchell, commemorating the Algerian Struggle for Independence
- Sculpture of Algerian national hero Zighoud Youcef, 1968
- Co-designer of the César Award trophy, French cinema equivalent of the American Oscar, 1976
