= Rachid Boudjedra =

Algerian writer

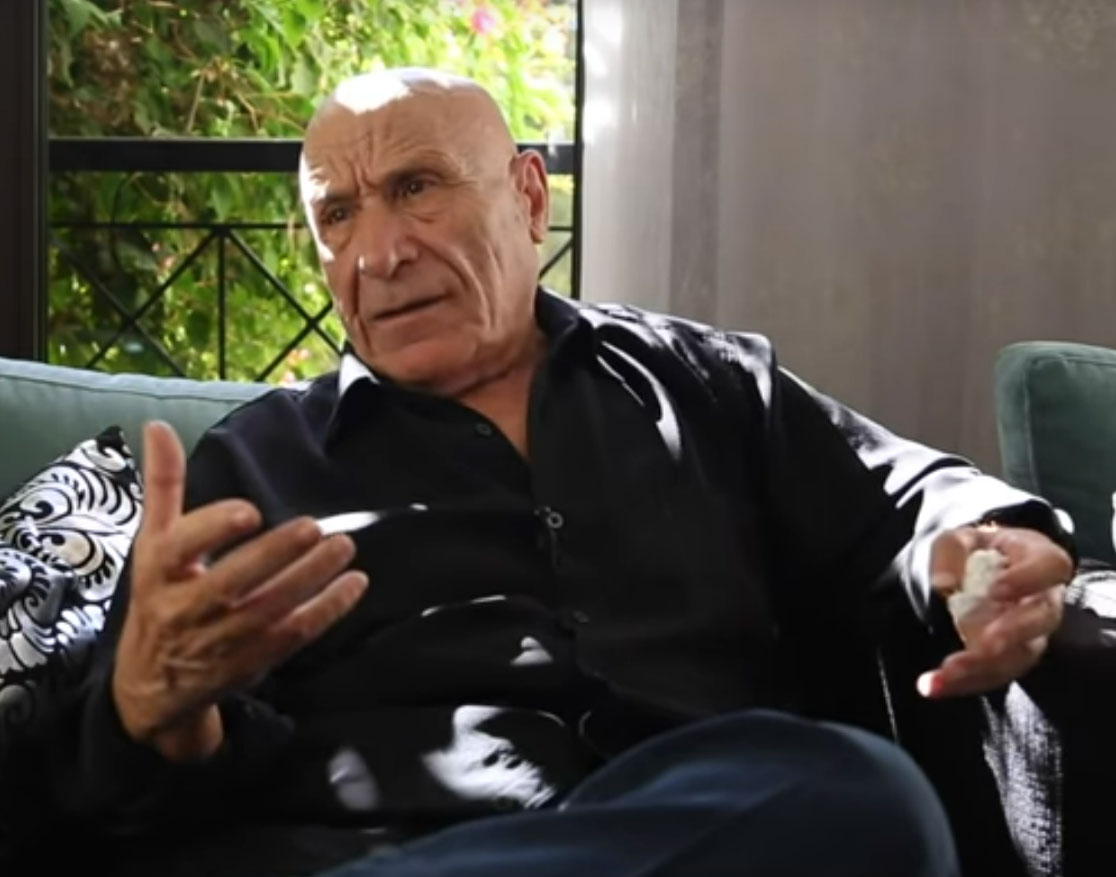
- Rachid Boudjedra
- Born: September 5, 1941 (age 84); Aïn Beïda, Algeria
- Occupations: Novelist, poet and playwright

Rachid Boudjedra (Arabic: رشيد بوجدرة) (b. 5 September 1941 in Aïn Beïda, Algeria) is an Algerian poet, novelist, playwright and critic. Boudjedra wrote in French from 1965 to 1981, at which point he switched to writing in Arabic, often translating his own works back and forth between the two languages. Boudjedra returned to writing in French in 1992 and has continued to write in that language ever since. Educated in Constantine and in Tunis (at the Collège Sadiki), Boudjedra later fought for the FLN during the Algerian War of Independence. He received his degree in philosophy from the Sorbonne, where he wrote a thesis on Céline. Upon receiving his degree, he returned to Algeria to teach, but was sentenced to two years in prison for his criticisms of the government and was exiled to Blida. He lived in France from 1969 till 1972, and then in Rabat, Morocco until 1975.

Boudjedra's fiction is written in a difficult, complex style, reminiscent of William Faulkner or Gabriel García Márquez in its intricacy. La Répudiation (1969, "The Repudiation") brought him sudden attention, both for the strength with which he challenged traditional Muslim culture in Algeria and for the strong reaction against him. Because a fatwa was issued which called for his death, he felt he had to live outside of Algeria. He has routinely been called the greatest living North African writer.

Boudjedra was awarded the Prix du roman arabe in 2010 for Les Figuiers de Barbarie.

André Naffis-Sahely has translated two of his novels into English: Les Figuiers de Barbarie as The Barbary Figs (Haus, 2012) and Les Funérailles as The Funerals (Haus, 2015).

Rachid Boudjedra has also been involved in writing a number of films. Chronique des années de braise (Chronicle of the Years of Fire), (dir. by Mohamed Lakhdar-Hamina) which, in 1975 won the Palme d'or at the Cannes Festival.

== Bibliography ==
- Pour ne plus rêver, poems with drawings by Mohammed Khadda, ÉNA, 1965; SNED, 1981.
- La Répudiation, Denoël, 1969; Gallimard Folio, 1981.
- La Vie quotidienne en Algérie, Hachette, 1971.
- Naissance du cinéma algérien, Maspero, 1971.
- L'Insolation, Denoël, 1972; Gallimard Folio, 1987.
- Journal Palestinien, Hachette, 1972.
- L'Escargot entêté, Denoël, 1977.
- Topographie idéale pour une agression caractérisée, Denoël, 1975; Gallimard Folio, 1986.
- Les 1001 Années de la nostalgie, Denoël, 1979; Gallimard Folio, 1988.
- Le Vainqueur de coupe, Denoël, 1981; Gallimard Folio, 1989.
- Extinction de voix, poèmes, SNED, 1981.
- Le Démantèlement, Denoël, 1982.
- La Macération, Denoël, 1984.
- Greffe, Denoël, 1985.
- La Pluie, Denoël, 1987.
- La Prise de Gibraltar, Denoël, 1987.
- Le Désordre des choses, Denoël, 1991.
- Fis de la haine, Denoël, 1992; Gallimard Folio, 1994.
- Timimoun, Denoël, 1994; Gallimard Folio, 1995.
- Mines de rien, théâtre, Denoël, 1995.
- Lettres algériennes, Grasset, 1995; Le Livre de Poche, 1997.
- La Vie à l'endroit, Grasset, 1997; Le Livre de poche 1999.
- Fascination, Grasset, 2000; Le Livre de poche 2002.
- Cinq Fragments du désert, Barzakh, 2001; Éd. de l’Aube, 2002.
- Les Funérailles, Grasset, 2003.
- Peindre l’Orient, Éd. Zulma, 2003.
- Hôtel Saint Georges, Éd. Dar El-Gharb, 2007.
- Les Figuiers de Barbarie, Grasset, 2010 (Winner of the Prix du Roman Arabe).
