= Jean Sénac =

Algerian author

- Born: 29 November 1926; Béni Saf, Algeria
- Died: 30 August 1973 (aged 46); Algiers, Algeria
- Occupation: Poet

Signature
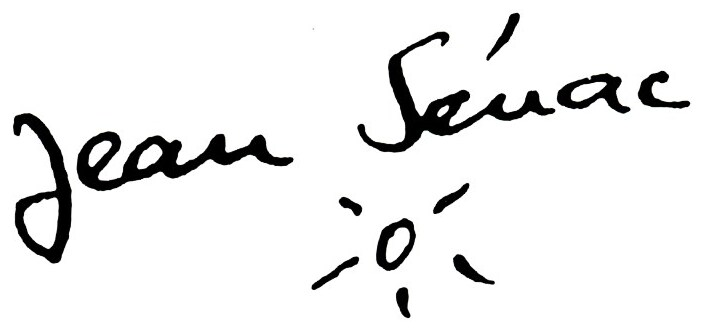

Jean Sénac (29 November 1926 – 30 August 1973) was an Algerian author. Born of an unknown father in Béni Saf in the Oran region of Algeria, the "poet who signed with a sun" was murdered in Algiers on 30 August 1973. His murder remains unsolved. Besides his poems and writings, he was renowned for a long-running relationship and correspondences with Albert Camus. A portion of his papers are stored at the City Archives in Marseille, France.

== Career ==
Sénac was an Algerian francophone poet who remained strongly attached to his Algerian nationality despite the French exodus from Algeria in the aftermath of the war of liberation. His poems were largely songs of revolution, which he hoped would help create a world of beauty and brotherhood in an Algeria that was open to all cultures.

His own struggles were strongly linked with his quest to better Algeria through poetry: a profound search for identity, both personal and cultural and his struggle to find acceptance in his homosexuality plagued him throughout his life; "This poor body also/ Wants its war of independence", he once wrote. Sénac was a great admirer of the work of such poets as Gérard de Nerval, Arthur Rimbaud, Antonin Artaud and Jean Genêt.

=== Relationship with Albert Camus ===
Sénac had a long-running relationship with French Algerian-born writer and Literary Nobel Prize laureate Albert Camus that lasted from 1947 to 1958. The contents of the letters remain mostly unknown, although Hamid Nacer-Khodja published a few and wrote about the history of the friendship in his essay Le Fils rebelle. many correspondences are of a literary nature, but some also discuss the independence movement in Algeria.

In April 1958 he broke relations with Albert Camus on a sour note blaming him for not supporting the plight of an Algerian student named Taleb executed for his political activities against the French. He did not communicate further with Camus from that day on until Camus' death early 1960.

== Selected works ==
=== Poetry ===
- Poèmes, preface by René Char, Paris, collection Espoir run by Albert Camus, Gallimard, 1954.
- Matinale de mon peuple, following portions of Diwan de l'État-Major and Diwan espagnol, preface by Mostefa Lacheraf, drawings by Abdallah Benanteur, Rodez, Subervie, 1961.
- La Rose et l'ortie, engraved slates by Mohammed Khadda, Paris-Alger, Cahiers du monde intérieur, Rhumbs, 1964.
- Citoyens de beauté, Rodez, Subervie, 1967; Charlieu, La Bartavelle éditeur, 1997.
- Avant-Corps, including Poèmes iliaques follow-up to Diwan du Noûn, Paris, Gallimard, 1968.
- Les Désordres poems written between 1953 and 1956, Paris, Librairie Saint-Germain-des-Prés, 1972.
- A-Corpoème, unpublished poems, following Les Désordres, and preceding Jean Sénac, Poète pour habiter son nom, essay by Jean Déjeux, Paris, Editions Saint-Germain-des-Prés, 1981. ISBN 978-2-243-01682-6.
- Dérisions et Vertiges, trouvures, preface by Jamel Eddine Bencheikh, cover design by Abdallah Benanteur, Arles, Actes Sud, 1983. ISBN 978-2-903098-61-2.
- Le Mythe du sperme – Méditerranée, Arles, Actes Sud, 1984. ISBN 978-2-903098-91-9.
- Œuvres poétiques, preface of René de Ceccatty, end notes by Hamid Nacer-Khodja, Editions Actes/Sud, 1999 [collection of 15 articles about the poet].
- Pour une terre possible, collected texts, notes, prefaces, a biography and bibliography by Hamid Nacer-Khodja, edition established by Marie Virolle, Paris, Marsa, 1999 [collection of unpublished poems and various writings, political texts, witness reports, literary critiques, arts, correspondence, mostly unpublished].

=== Autobiography ===
- Ebauche du père, preface by Rabah Belamri, Paris, Gallimard, 1982. ISBN 978-2-07-071412-4.

=== Essays ===
- Le Soleil sous les armes, Eléments d'une poésie de la résistance algérienne, Rodez, Subervie, 1957.
- Anthologie de la nouvelle poésie algérienne, essai et choix de Jean Sénac, Poésie 1, n° 14, Paris, Librairie Saint-Germain-des-Prés, 1971.
- Journal (janvier-juillet 1954), suivi de Les Leçons d'Edgar, Pézenas, Le Haut-Quartier, collection Méditerranée vivante, Edmond Charlot editor, 1983. ISBN 978-2-904823-00-8; Saint-Denis, Novetlé, with a preface of Jean Pélégri, 1996.
- Visages d'Algérie, Ecrits sur l'art, texts collected by Hamid Nacer-Khodja, preface by Guy Dugas, [writings notably of Mohamed Aksouh, Abdallah Benanteur, Baya, Sauveur Galliéro, Mohammed Khadda, Jean de Maisonseul, Maria Manton, Denis Martinez, Louis Nallard], Paris, Paris-Méditerranée / Alger, EDIF 2000, 2002. ISBN 978-2-84272-156-5.

== Works about Jean Sénac ==
- Jamel-Eddine Bencheikh, L'Homme-poème Jean Sénac (poem), Actes/Sud.
- Jean-Pierre Péroncel-Hugoz, Assassinat d'un poète, followed by an unpublished text of Jean Sénac, Heures de mon adolescence, preface by Tahar Ben Jelloun, Marseille, Editions Jeanne Laffitte, 1983. ISBN 978-2-86604-003-1.
- Poésie au Sud, Jean Sénac et la nouvelle poésie algérienne d'expression française [many unpublished materials], Archives de la Ville de Marseille, 1983.
- Le Soleil fraternel, Jean Sénac et la nouvelle poésie algérienne d'expression française (Notes from Rencontres Méditerranéennes de Provence, 1983), Marseille, Editions Jeanne Lafitte, 1985. ISBN 978-2-86604-012-3.
- Rabah Belamri, Jean Sénac, entre désir et douleur, Etude et choix de textes, Alger, Office des Publications Universitaires, 1989.
- Hommage à Jean Sénac, Paris, Awal, n° 10, 1993.
- Jamel-Eddine Bencheikh et Christiane Chaulet Achour, Jean Sénac: clandestin des deux rives, Paris, Editions Séguier, 1999.
- Dominique Le Boucher, Les deux Jean; Jean Sénac, l'homme soleil, Jean Pélégri, l'homme caillou (correspondence 1962-1973, unpublished poem), Montpellier, Chèvre-feuille étoilée, and Alger, Barzakh, 2002. ISBN 978-2-914467-05-6.
- Nicole Tuccelli and Emile Temime, Jean Sénac, l'Algérien, preface by Jean Daniel, Paris, Editions Autrement, 2003.
- Hamid Nacer-Khodja, Albert Camus, Jean Sénac, ou le fils rebelle, preface by Guy Dugas, Paris, Editions Paris-Méditerranée, and Alger, EDIF 2000, 2004. ISBN 978-2-84272-206-7.
- Bernard Mazo, Jean Sénac, Aden, 2005.
- Kai Krienke, Jean Sénac: The Sun Under the Weapons, Correspondence & Notes from Algeria (Part I & II), Lost & Found: The CUNY Poetics Document Initiative, New York, 2015. ISBN 978-0-9888945-3-2.

== Films about Jean Sénac ==
- Ali Akika, Jean Sénac, Le forgeron du soleil, 58 mn, Paris, Productions La Lanterne, 2003.
- Abdelkrim Bahloul, Le soleil assassiné, 85 mn, co-production Franco-Belge, Pierre Grise Productions, 2004.
