= Aouchem =

Aouchem Group
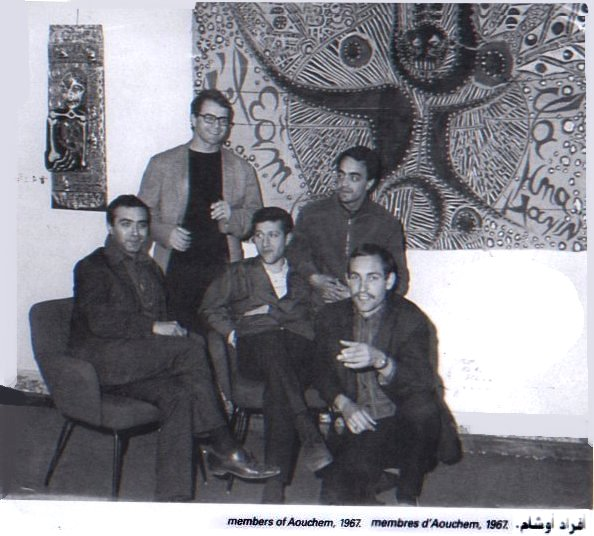
- Founding members of the Aouchem Group, UNAP Gallery, Algiers (January 3, 1967)
- Branch: Modern art, Postcolonial art
- Years active: 1967–1971
- Location: Algiers, Algeria
- Major figures: Choukri Mesli, Denis Martinez (painter), Mustapha Adane, Baya, Rezki Zérarti, Saïd Saïdani
- Influences: Berber art, Saharan rock inscriptions, traditional tattoos, Algerian folk art
- Influenced: Contemporary Algerian painting, École du Signe

The Aouchem Group (Arabic: أوشام; Berber languages: أوشام; sometimes rendered as Aoucham or Aouchem — literally "tattoo") is a collective of Algerian visual artists founded in 1967 in Algiers. The group advocated for the reappropriation of local cultural symbols and motifs (tattoos, traditional graphics, popular art, and Saharan rock inscriptions) in order to create an autonomous modern visual language against the orientalist legacy of colonialism.

== History ==
Aouchem was created in March 1967. Its first exhibition took place at the gallery of the Union nationale des arts plastiques (UNAP) in Algiers. A second presentation followed later that year at the Blida Cultural Center, expanding the group's influence nationally. The movement remained active until the early 1970s.

== Key members ==
Notable members associated with the group include:

- Choukri Mesli (organizer of the first exhibition)
- Denis Martinez (painter)
- Mustapha Adane
- Baya (Fatma Haddad-Mahieddine) — guest and participant in Aouchem exhibitions
- Rezki Zérarti, Saïd Saïdani, Mohamed Benbaghdad, Mustapha Akmoun, Hamid Abdoun, among others.

== Aesthetics and manifesto ==
The name "Aouchem" refers to the word for "tattoo" in Tamazight and Algerian Arabic. The collective considered symbols—tattoos, rock carvings, and folk ornaments as the matrix of an Algerian artistic modernity. The group's manifesto, published in 1967 at its first exhibition, proclaimed its intention to draw upon this "millennial heritage" and create an art where "the symbol is stronger than bombs." Members experimented with unconventional materials such as leather, sand, metal, enamel, and natural pigments, highlighting the symbols.

== Activity and influence ==
The Aouchem movement emerged in post-independence Algeria, during a period when multiple artistic currents sought to forge a national visual identity (parallel to the École du Signe, and to the works of Mohammed Khadda, M'hamed Issiakhem, and Abdallah Benanteur). Although collective activity declined after 1971, Aouchem's aesthetic and theoretical influence persisted in Algerian painting, particularly in the renewed use of signs, symbols, and local materials. Its impact is discussed in several exhibition catalogues and scholarly texts.

== Selected exhibition timeline ==
- March 1967 — First collective exhibition of the Aouchem Group, UNAP Gallery, Algiers (manifesto issued).
- June 1967 — Exhibition in Blida (FLN Cultural Center), expanding the group's audience and incorporating new members.
- 1971 — Final reported collective activities and exhibitions.
- Recent years — The group has been referenced in several international exhibitions on Arab abstraction, such as Taking Shape: Abstraction from the Arab World, 1950s–1980s (NYU / Block Museum).

== Publications and catalogues ==
- Exhibition catalogues — 1967 UNAP Gallery and Blida exhibitions (referenced in later critical studies).
- Taking Shape: Abstraction from the Arab World, 1950s–1980s — Exhibition catalogue (Block Museum / NYU) recontextualizing Arab abstraction and including Aouchem.
- Algerian Painters as Pioneers of Modernism — DafBeirut publication featuring a dedicated section on Aouchem.
- Critical essays and interviews in Algerian cultural media such as Founoune, Algérie360, and Max Marchand / Mouloud Feraoun.

== Academic sources ==
- Thesis: L’écriture dans la pratique des artistes algériens de 1962 à ... — doctoral dissertation (CORE), with a chapter on Aouchem.
- Article: "La peinture Aouchem : un patrimoine visuel en question(s)" by Belhachemi Noureddine (ASJP platform).
- Cahiers / international studies: Les Cahiers du Musée national d’art moderne (MNAM/Cairn).
- International studies such as MoMA and Block Museum projects on modern Arab art.

== Gallery ==
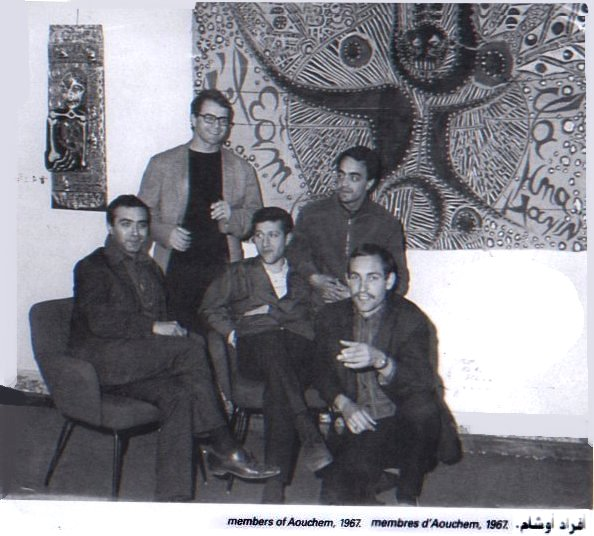
Founding members of the Aouchem Group, UNAP Gallery, Algiers (January 3, 1967)

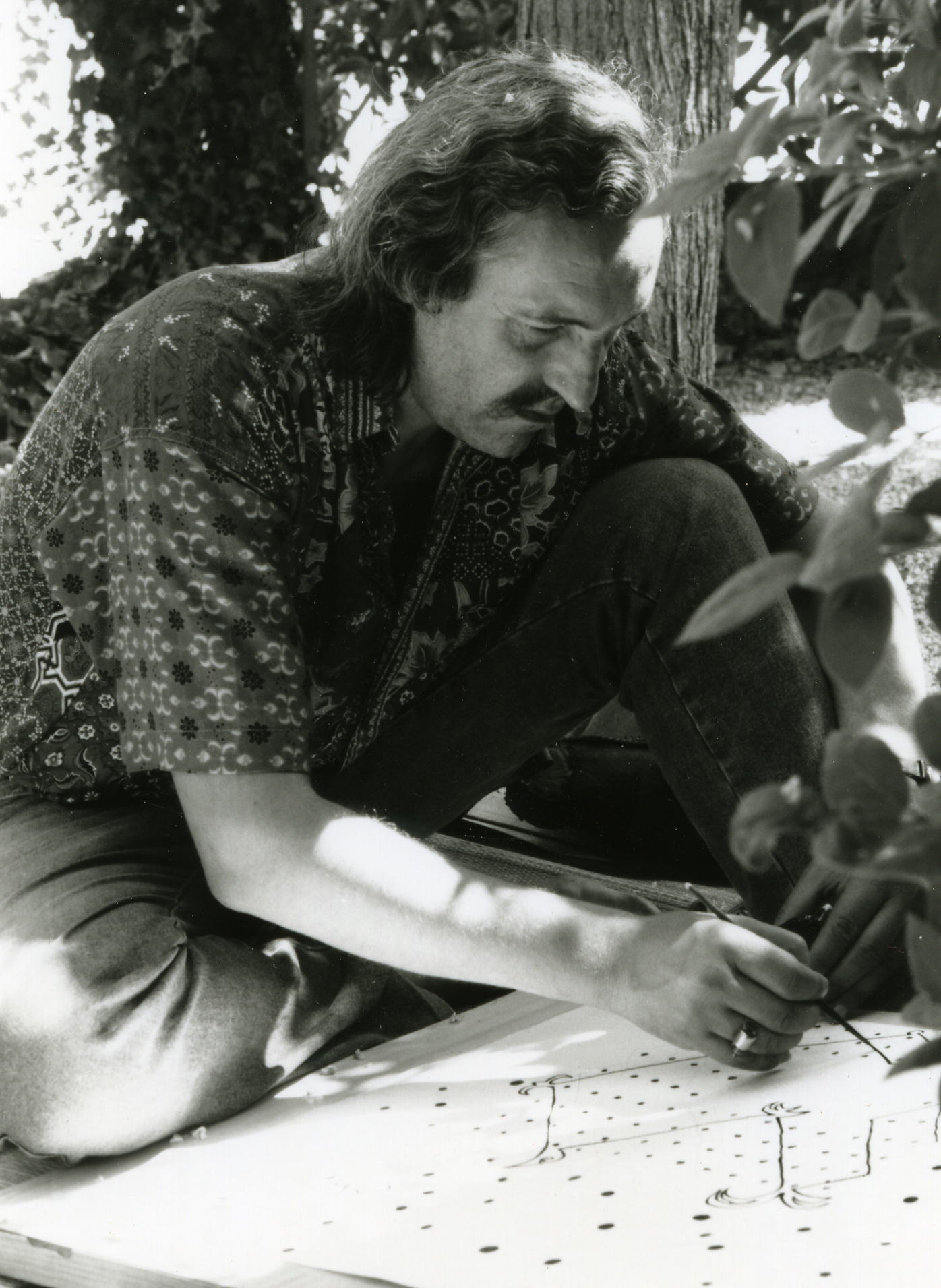
Denis Martinez (1990)

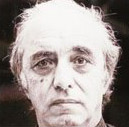
Choukri Mesli

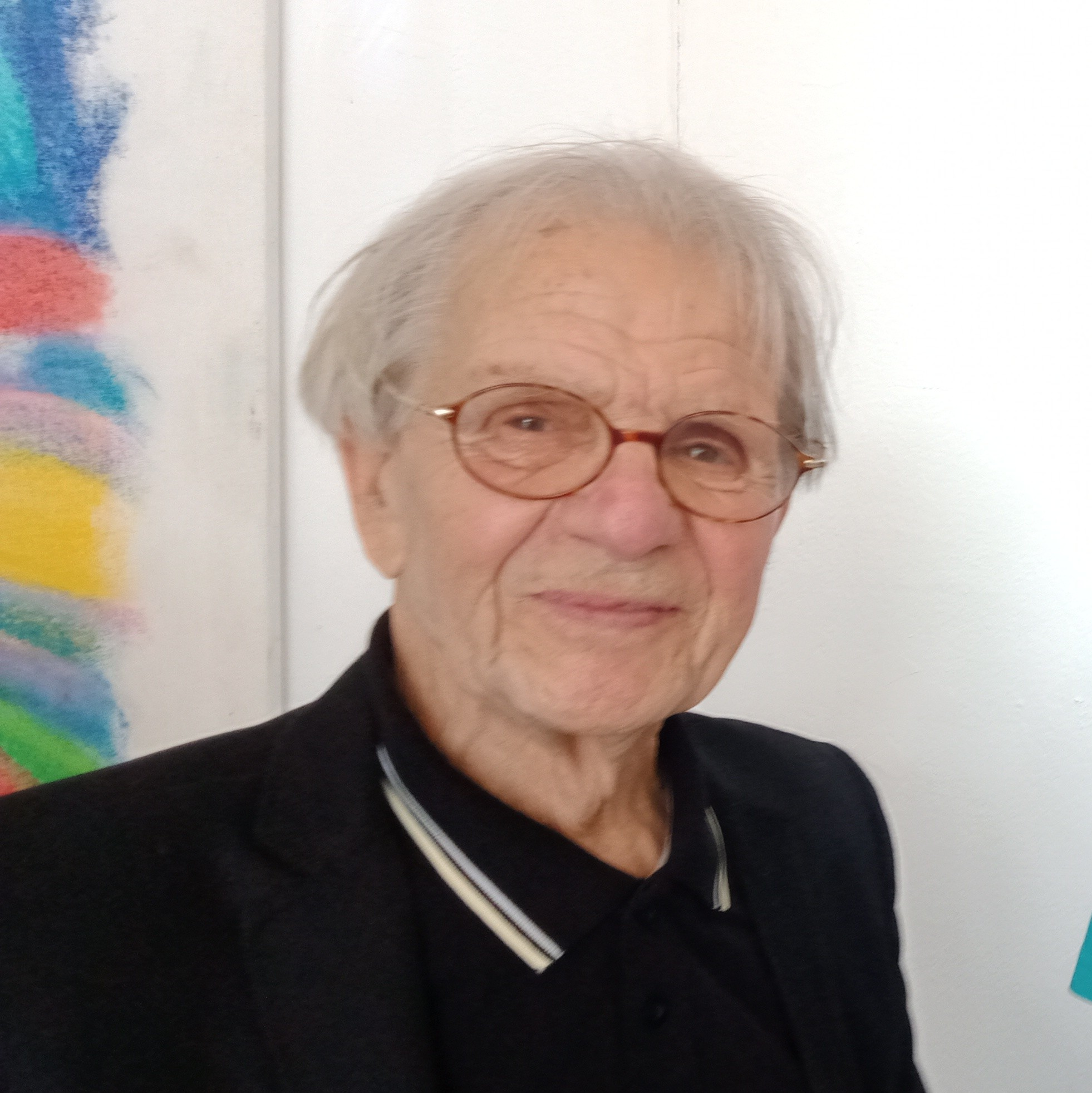
Mustapha Adane (2022)

== Legacy ==
Aouchem is now recognized as a pivotal moment in Algerian modern art. Its manifesto, exhibitions, and material experimentation are regularly cited in art history research and international catalogues re-examining Arab abstraction.

== See also ==
- Mustapha Adane
