= Nadia Benbouta =

Algerian artist (born 1970)

- Born: Nadia Benbouta; 21 January 1970 (age 56); Algiers, Algeria
- Education: École supérieure des beaux-arts d’Alger; École nationale supérieure des Beaux-Arts (Paris)
- Known for: Visual art
- Awards: Prix Albéric Rocheron (1998); Prix Fenêtre des Arts Européens (1999)

Nadia Benbouta (born 21 January 1970) is an Algerian artist who lives and works in Paris. She uses photographs and images from her travels, combining them with cultural and decorative motifs to create contrast within her visuals.

== Life and career ==
Born in Algiers, she received education at two art schools, the École supérieure des beaux-arts d'Alger and the École nationale supérieure des Beaux-Arts.

Her art combines unassuming elements like found images from advertisements, children's films, comic artwork, and decorative designs. She pairs these innocuous visuals with militaristic imagery and weaponry, creating disparity within the image. Her work has a tragic, cynical view of the world, using dark imagery to explore it.

Benbouta works across many visual mediums. Her body of work includes photography, painting, printmaking, street art, neon lights, etc.

Her work has been displayed in solo shows in France, Germany and the Ukraine. She has participated in group exhibitions in Paris, Lyon, Marseille, Toulouse, Germany, Norway, Greece, Algeria and New York City.

Benbouta received the Prix L’Art et la route, her first award, in 1997. She also received the Prix Albéric Rocheron in 1998 and the Prix Fenêtre des Arts Européens awarded by the Sprengel Museum in Hanover in 1999.

Her work is held in the collections of the Bibliothèque nationale de France, the École nationale supérieure des Beaux-Arts, the Musée de Serignan and the town of Bobigny.

== Exhibitions ==
- "Dialogues" - Galerie Anne-Marie et Roland Pallade (2009)
- "Un marchand, un artiste" - Marché Dauphine (2019)
- Biennale d'Art Contemporain de Rabat (2019)
