= Lydia Ourahmane =

Algerian artist (born 1992)

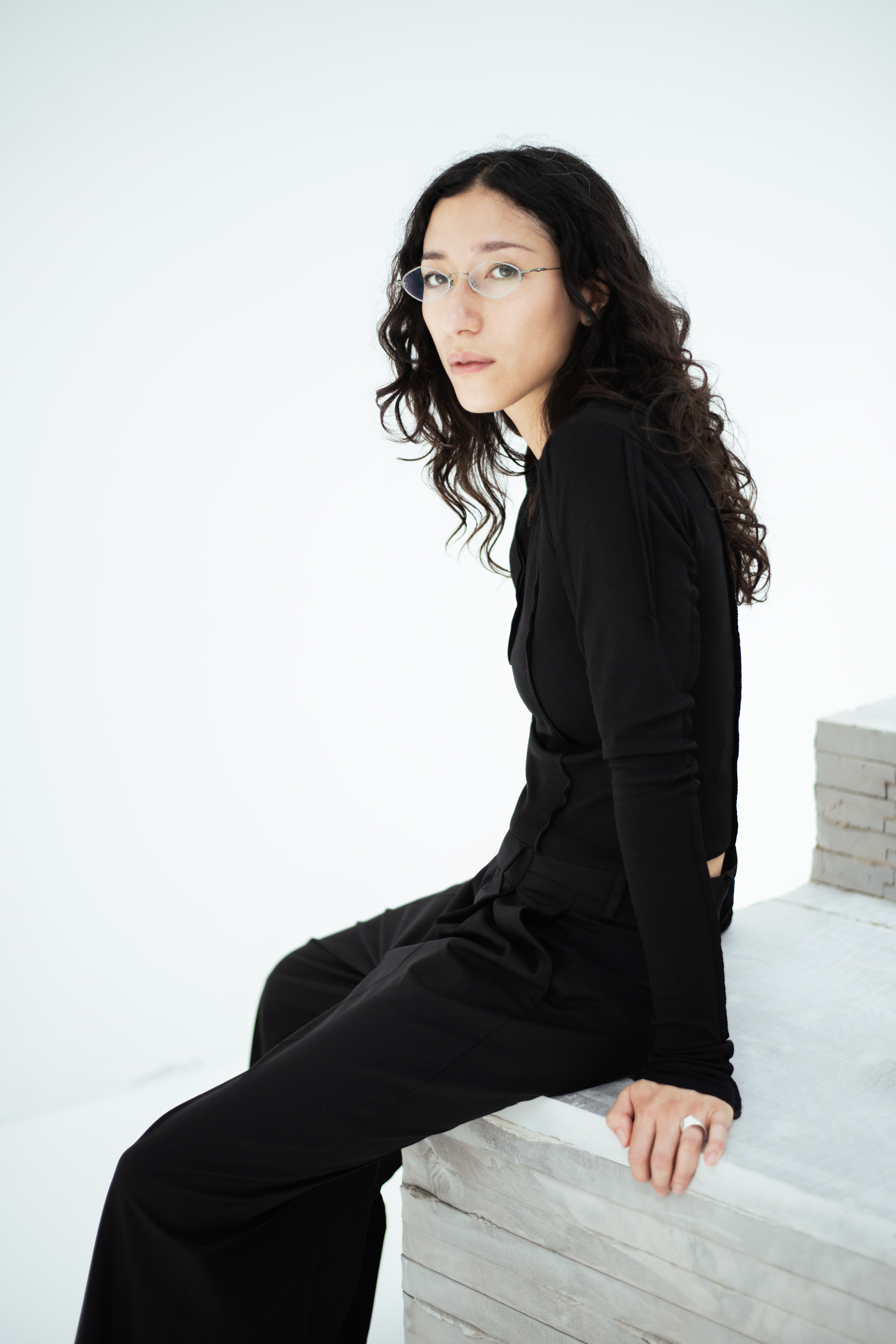
Portrait by César Segarra

Lydia Ourahmane (born 1992) is a conceptual artist based in Barcelona, London and Algiers.

Ourahmane's practise addresses how contemporary issues; geopolitics, migration and the histories of colonialism are registered on the body. Drawing on personal and collective narratives she incorporates video, sound, performance, sculpture and installation on an often large or monumental scale that have consequences beyond the walls of her exhibitions. Ourahmane challenges broader institutional structures through logistics and bureaucratic processes.

Her work was included in the 60th Venice Biennale, 15th Gwangju Biennale, 15th Istanbul Biennial (2017), 34th Bienal de São Paulo (2021), New Museum Triennial and Manifesta 12, Palermo (2018).

== Early life ==
Lydia Ourahmane was born in Saïda, Algeria, in 1992. Her mother is Malaysian of Chinese descent and her father is Algerian. She grew up in a Christian commune in Arzew, Oran during the Algerian Civil War (1991-2002).

== Work ==
In 2014, she graduated from Goldsmiths University London with The Third Choir, a sound installation comprising 20 oil barrels from the Algerian oil company Naftal. The Third Choir became the first artwork to legally leave the borders of Algeria since their independence from France in 1962 when a law was put in place prohibiting the movement of Art in order to protect Algeria’s cultural assets. The law was amended by section 75 in the Finance Act 2014 through the process of the work.

The Third Choir was acquired by the Tate in 2023. It is accompanied by ‘The Third Choir Archives’ a file of 934 documents involved in the process of exporting 20 oil barrels from Algeria to the United Kingdom.

In 2018, she presented her first institutional solo exhibition at Chisenhale Gallery. In the Absence of our Mothers 2015–18, consisted of a single gold tooth, which resided in the gallery space, and a duplicate gold tooth that was implanted within Ourahmane’s mouth made from a gold chain. The work was shown alongside documents referencing Ourahmane’s grandfather’s resistance to military service under the French occupation of Algeria by extracting his own teeth. The archive also referred to the documents’ current use by his descendants to claim French citizenship by right of blood.

Her 2026 solo show at Nicoletta Fiorucci Foundation, took place alongside the 61st International Art Exhibition of La Biennale di Venezia.

She was awarded the Rosa Schapire Art Prize in 2024 at Hamburger Kunsthalle.

== Barzakh ==
"Barzakh" was Ourahmane's first solo exhibition in Switzerland, presenting what she described as an "exhibition-as-limbo" at Kunsthalle Basel. The title references the Arabic concept of barzakh—a liminal space between life and death.

The centerpiece was 21 Boulevard Mustapha Benboulaid (2021), consisting of the complete furnishings from Ourahmane's apartment in Algiers— Crucially, these weren't just her belongings: the apartment was previously inhabited by a woman who had returned from Germany with the furniture as a divorce settlement.

The objects traveled nearly 1,500 kilometers from Algiers to Basel, creating an uncanny domestic environment where visitors could sit, touch, and explore the intimate possessions of two women whose lives mysteriously intertwined.

A major sculptural element was 21 Boulevard Mustapha Benboulaid (entrance), 1901–2021, the extracted door frame from the same apartment— with multiple doors, bricks and locks. The wooden door dates to 1901, when the French constructed the building during their colonial remodeling of Algerian cities to mirror French "homeland" characteristics. A second metal door was added during the 90's Civil War for security. 21 Boulevard Mustapha Benboulaid (entrance), 1901–2021 was shown at 60th Venice Biennale curated by Adriano Pedrosa and acquired by the Stedelikj Museum Amsterdam.

== 108 Days ==
In 2023 she activated the MACBA, Barcelona as part of a major participatory and radical work. 108 Days significantly altered the way the Museum normally operated, firstly by leaving the gallery space empty, and secondly by interpreting the Museum’s commission to produce an artwork by inviting 108 participants. Activations included a conversation between UN Special Rapporteur Francesca Albanese and neuroscientist Isabel Valli, climate activism workshops by Extinction Rebellion and Scientists Rebellion and performances by Escuela Camino4 and Mujeres Diaspora.

== Exhibitions ==
Ourahmane has had recent solo exhibitions include; 108 Days at MACBA, Barcelona; Tassili, SculptureCenter, NY, Fondation Louis Vuitton, Paris and Mercer Union, Toronto (2022-2023) B7L9, Tunis, rhizome, Algiers (2023); Survival in the afterlife, Portikus, Frankfurt and De Appel, Amsterdam (2021); Barzakh, Kunsthalle Basel, Triangle – Astérides, Marseille, S.M.A.K. Ghent (2021-2022); صرخة شمسیة Solar Cry, Wattis Institute for Contemporary Arts, San Francisco (2020); and The you in us, Chisenhale Gallery, London. (2018), among others.

In 2018 Ourahmane presented Music for Two Seas an underwater sound work in the coast of Stromboli with collaborator Nicolas Jaar. With collaborator Alex Ayed, she presented Laws of Confusion at Renaissance Society, Chicago (2021) and was included in Risquons-Tout, WIELS Contemporary Art Center, Brussels (2020). On 1 October 2022 she presented sync a 24-hour performance of live heartbeats at the KW Institute for Contemporary Art, Berlin in collaboration with artist Daniel Blumberg. sync was exhibited at the 60th Venice Biennale in 2024.

== Other activities ==
In 2023, Ourahmane signed an open letter in support of the appointment of curator Mohamed Almusibli as director of Kunsthalle Basel. She signed the Artforum open letter supporting Palestinian liberation.
