= Katia Kameli =

French-Algerian visual artist

- Born: 1973 (age 52–53); Clermont-Ferrand, France
- Education: École Nationale des Beaux-Arts in Bourges; École Supérieure d’Beaux-Arts in Marseille
- Notable work: Le Cantique des Oiseaux (2022); Le Roman Algérien (2019)
- Website: https://www.katiakameli.com

Katia Kameli (Arabic: كاتيا كميلي; born 1973) is a French-Algerian visual artist who works mainly in film and video. Her primary artistic focus is the subject of Algeria, and she has used film to explore Algerian history, culture and politics. Kameli's solo exhibitions have included the three-part film Le Roman Algérien and the multi-media project Le Cantique des Oiseaux, and she has participated in group exhibitions in France, Portugal, Belgium, Senegal, Mali, and the Democratic Republic of the Congo. Her work is contained in collections at the Smith College Museum of Art, the Musée National d'Art Moderne, and the Centre National des Arts Plastiques

== Early life and education ==
Katia Kameli was born in 1973 in Clermont-Ferrand, France, and grew up dividing her time between her mother's family in France and her father's family in Algeria. She trained as an artist under the guidance of Italian painter Michelangelo Pistoletto, and completed her first filmmaking project as a student in 1998. In 2000 she graduated from the École Nationale des Beaux-Arts in Bourges, going on to complete postgraduate studies in the subject of New Media at the Ecole Supérieure des Beaux-Arts in Marseille.

== Artistic career ==
Kameli has primarily focused on the subject of Algeria for her art. While she is largely known for working with film and video, she also incorporates mediums such as sculpture, tapestry, drawing, music, and textual art into her projects.

Between 2002 and 2004, Kameli created the film Bledi, un scénario possible to explore the Algerian civil war. She completed a London residency with the Delfina Foundation in 2012, and joined the 2014 Tara Mediterranean expedition as an artist in residence. Her early solo exhibitions included events in New York (2014), London (2016), and Douchy-les-Mines (2018). In 2019, Kameli had a solo exhibition in Germany at the Kunsthalle Münster, featuring her new three-part film Le Roman Algérien alongside other works. In May 2020, Le Roman Algérien was exhibited at the Kalmar art museum in Sweden. The film centres around a family-run kiosk in Algiers that sells photos, postcards, and coins, introducing discussions of art, storytelling, and collective memory before covering some of the early 2019 Algerian demonstrations against president Abdelaziz Bouteflika.

In 2022, Kameli was selected for funding from the French government's Les Mondes Nouveaux program for her project Le Cantique des Oiseaux, which used sculpture and music to interpret the work of Persian poet Farîd od-dîn' Attar. Her final installation was showcased in Paris and then Berlin.

Kameli has taken part in group exhibitions in France, Portugal, Belgium, Senegal, Mali, and the Democratic Republic of the Congo, and her work is contained in collections at the Smith College Museum of Art, the Musée National d'Art Moderne, and the Centre National des Arts Plastiques. Her films have been screened by the International Film Festival Rotterdam and the Cinémathèque française. In 2022, she was nominated for the Prix AWARE, awarded annually by the non-profit Archives of Women Artists, Research & Exhibitions (AWARE) to recognize the works and careers of French female artists.

=== Critical analysis of works ===
In an analysis of artists who explore "new sociocultural spaces born from immigration", academic Catherine Bernard examines Kameli's 2009 film Dissolution, which puts the journey of immigrants into focus using the metaphor of a boat arriving and docking at port. Bernard notes that "conveying a sense of in-betweenness" is a foundational part of Kameli's work, stemming from the artist's personal experiences of having roots in two different countries.
