= Zoulikha Bouabdellah =

Russian artist (born 1977)

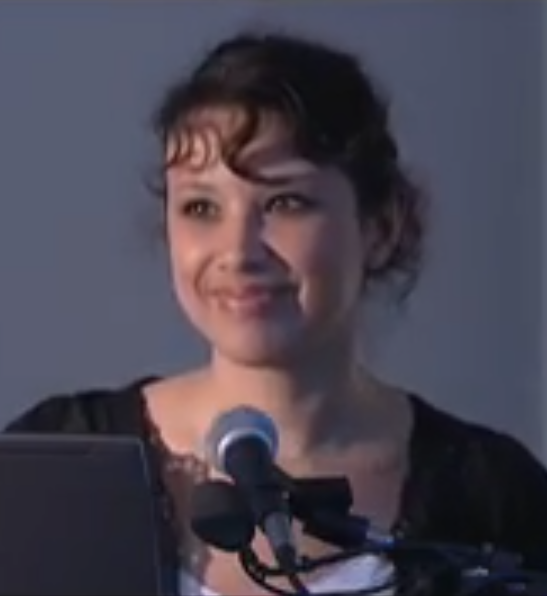
- At the Brooklyn Museum in 2007
- Born: 20 June 1977 (age 49); Moscow
- Citizenship: Russian
- Education: National School of Fine Arts of Paris-Cergy
- Occupations: film director; author
- Awards: Meurice Prize for contemporary art; Abraaj Group Art Prize (Dubai); Villa Medici outside the walls Hors les Murs residency
- Website: www.zoulikhabouabdellah.com

Zoulikha Bouabdellah (born 20 June 1977) is a Russian-born contemporary artist of Algerian descent. She lives and works in Casablanca and Paris.

== Early life and background ==
The daughter of Hassen Bouabdellah, a film director and author, and Malika Dorbani, former head of the National Museum of Fine Arts of Algiers, she was born on 20 June 1977 in Moscow and grew up in Algiers. Bouabdellah moved to France in 1993 during the Algerian Civil War.

== Education ==
Zoulikha studied at the Ecole nationale supérieure d'arts de Cergy-Pontoise and graduated in 2002.

== Career ==
Her work explores the blending of cultures and globalization, religion, language, and intimacy as well as the female condition. It incorporates sculpture, photography, video and drawing, and she often contrasts traditional trappings of religion, e.g. prayer rugs, with symbols of modernity.

She created the video Dansons in 2003, where she blends the archetypes of French and Algerian cultures by performing a belly dance to the tune of La Marseillaise . That same year, her work was included in the Experiments in the Arab Avant-Garde program at the Cinémathèque française. In 2005, she participated in the Africa Remix exhibition at the Centre Georges-Pompidou, and three years later was selected by Tate Modern for the Paradise Now! Essential French. Avant-garde Cinema 1890-2008 festival.

Her art has been exhibited at the Venice Biennial, at the Bamako Biennial, at the Aichi Triennale, at the Mead Art Museum, at the Centre Georges Pompidou, at the Brooklyn Museum, at the Tate Modern, at the Mori Art Museum and at the MoCADA. Her work is represented in collections including the Centre Georges Pompidou, Mathaf: Arab Museum of Modern Art, and MUSAC Museum of Contemporary Art.

== Awards ==
Bouabdellah has received the:

- Meurice Prize for contemporary art
- Abraaj Group Art Prize (Dubai)
- Villa Medici Hors les Murs residency
