= Samta Benyahia =

Algerian artist (born 1950)

- Born: 1950 (age 75–76); Constantine, Algeria
- Known for: Plastic arts
- Website: {{URL|example.com|optional display text}}

Samta Benyahia (Arabic: صامته بن يحيى) born in Constantine, Algeria, in 1950, is an Algerian French artist, known for her Arab Berber Andalusian geometrical patterns and rosaceae, called fatima.

== Biography ==
Benyahia studied at the École Nationale Supérieure des Arts Décoratifs, Paris from 1974 to 1980, and subsequently taught at the École supérieure des Beaux-Arts fr:École des beaux-arts d'Alger in Algiers from 1980 to 1988.

She moved to France in 1988 and received her Master of Advanced Studies in plastic arts from the University of Paris VIII.

She currently works and lives in Paris.

In the past twenty years, Benyahia has participated in numerous group and solo art exhibitions in venues throughout the world, including the Dak’Art Biennale of Dakar, Senegal (2004), the Venice Biennial (2003), the Modern Art Oxford, England (2003), and the Kulturhuset, Stockholm, Sweden (2004), the Spacex Gallery, Exeter, UK (2001–2002), the Residency and Exhibition Art in General, New York City (1996), as well as at several European and worldwide galleries.

Samta is the sister of painter and sculptor Ahmed Benyahia, student of César Baldaccini at l'École des Beaux-Arts in Paris, and later a co-designer of the César Award trophy.

She is the aunt of Algerian infographic artist and cartoonist Racim Benyahia.

== Works ==
In the Architecture of the Veil, Benyahia's work was described as acquiring its theme:

from the Mashrabiya, the openwork screens used in Mediterranean Islamic architecture to cover windows and balconies, allowing those inside—typically women—to view the outside world without being seen. The installation provides a beautiful and dynamic exploration of gender as well as the dialectic between interior and exterior, light and shadow, concealment and revelation, and private versus public space.

What it is difficult to convey in words, however, is how beautiful and entrancing her work is. Seduced by colour and pattern, the viewer is invited to negotiate the imagined boundaries within the contemporary space of the gallery whilst her use of traditional North African designs also explore the idea of infinity. Through the use of repetition, skilled designers from medieval Arabia as well as contemporary artists like Benyahia use complex yet familiar patterns to give an impression of endlessness, which is often associated with the Islamic conception of God. Shimmering like reflections of the sea, her piece is a stunning invitation to "lose oneself" in the overall decorative design.
