= Mohammed Khadda =

Algerian painter, sculptor and writer (1930 – 1991)

Mohammed Khadda محمد الخدة
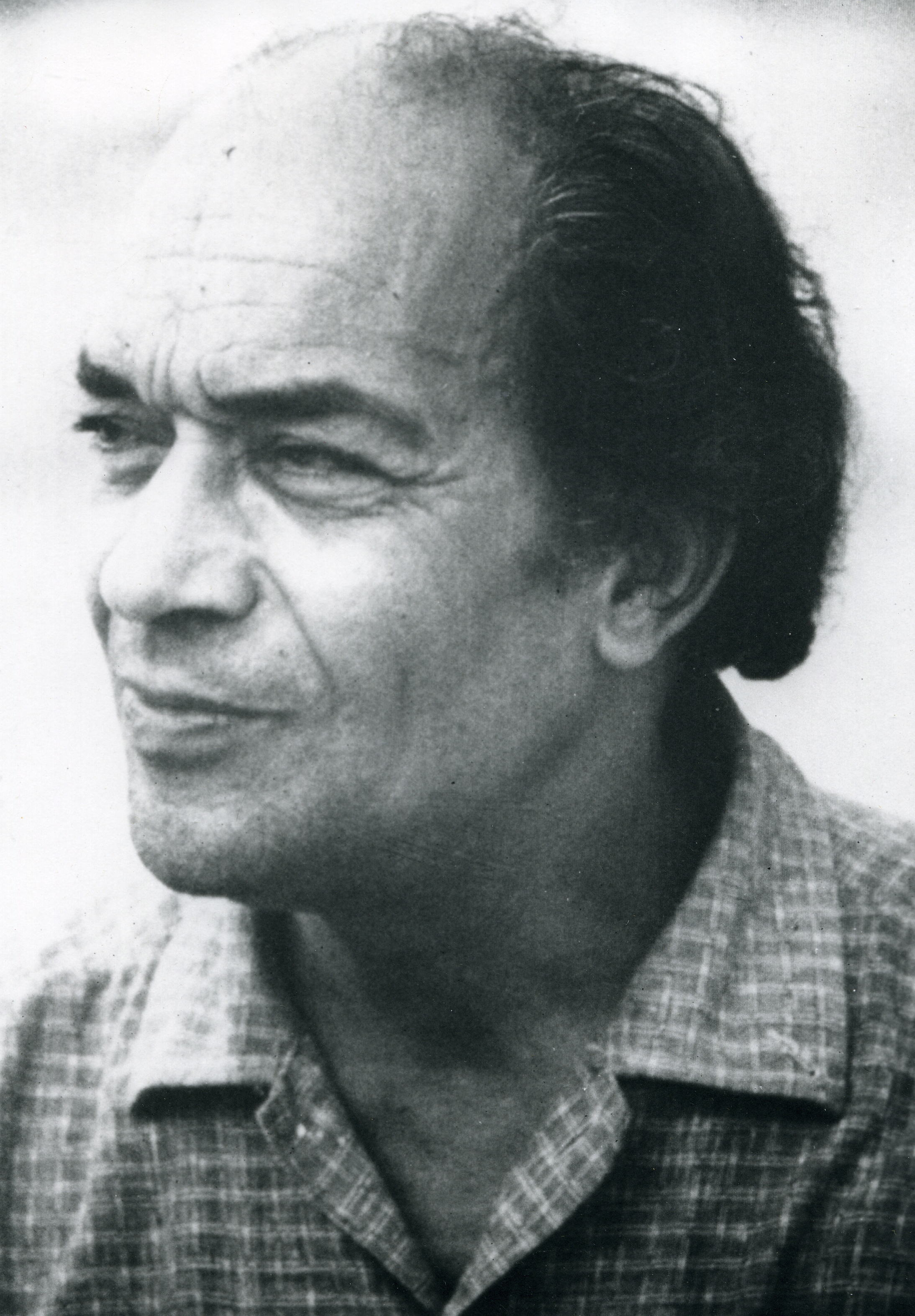
- Mohammad Khadda in 1981
- Born: 14 March 1930; Mostaganem, French Algeria
- Died: 4 May 1991 (aged 61); Algiers, Algeria
- Known for: Painting, Arabic Calligraphy
- Spouse: Naget Khadda

Signature
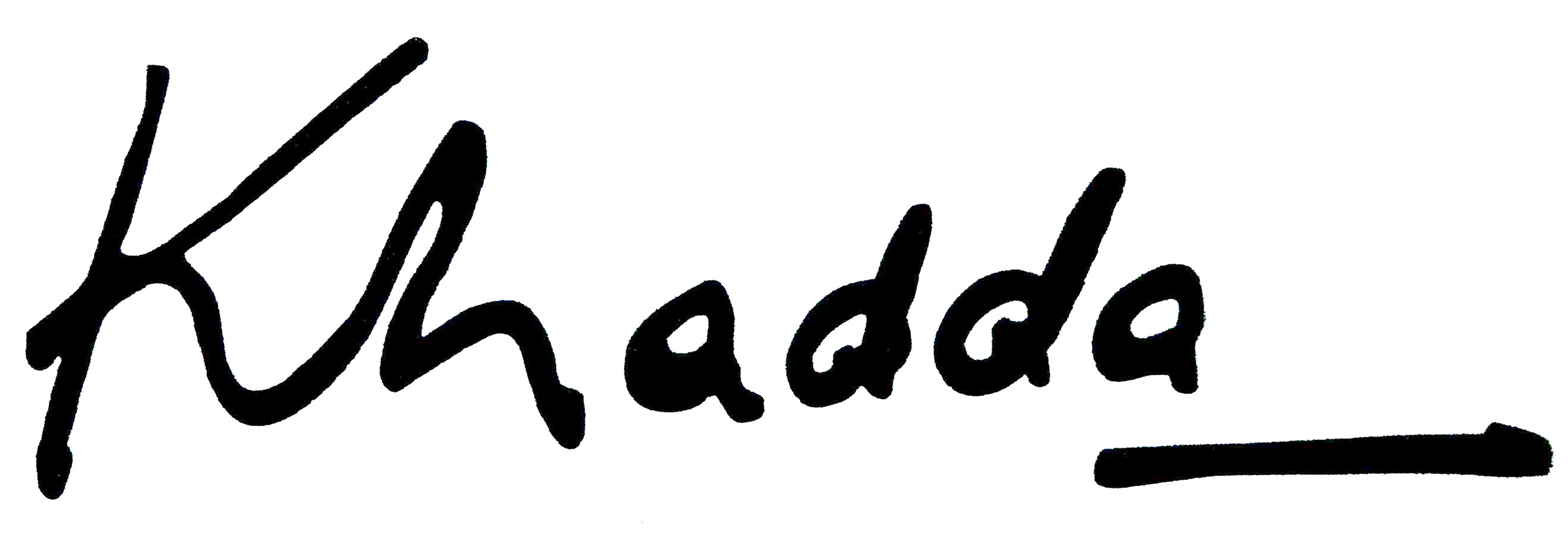

Mohammed Khadda (Arabic: محمد الخدة; 14 March 1930 – 4 May 1991) was an Algerian painter, sculptor, and writer. Khadda has been considered to be among the founders of contemporary Algerian painting and one of the many representatives of the "sign painters.", as indicated by his nickname "peintre du signe" given by Jean Sénac. He debuted in 1960. His influences included Cubism and Arabic calligraphy. He tended toward the non-figurative or abstract. He represented a generation of Algerian artists who combined the ideas of calligraphic heritage and formal language of Western formal writing through Western abstraction through the 1950s.

== Biography ==
=== Early life ===
Mohammed Khadda was born in 1930 in Mostaganem, when Algeria was still under the occupation of France. He was the eldest of five children, two of whom died while infants. His father, Bendehiba Khadda, was born in 1912 in the town of Mina and moved to Mostaganem at a very young age. Although Bendehiba was born blind, he held various occupations such as a bricklayer and a dock worker. Khadda’s mother, Nebi El Ghali was born in 1911 in Zemora, Algeria, a city near Tiaret. When she was a little girl, her parents were murdered by a settler tribe near where she lived. She, as Mohammed’s father, was also blind, but managed to adjust. Benedehiba and Nebi met in Mostaganem and were married in 1929.

=== Education and professional career ===
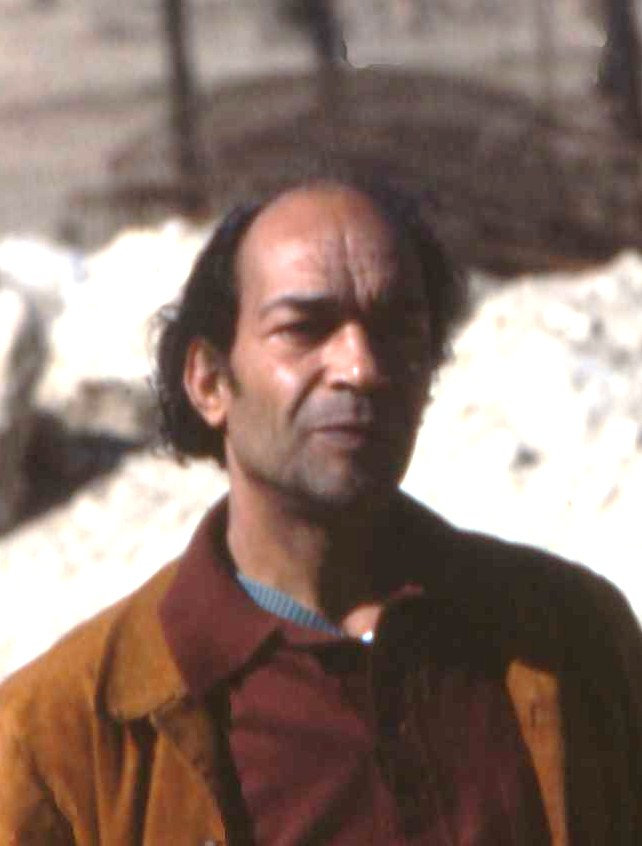
Mohammed Khadda, circa 1982

In 1936, Mohammed Khadda attended a school in Tigditt, Mostaganem in an Arab neighborhood. In 1942, he and his family had to leave Mostaganem because of a famine in the area. The family moved to Tiaret and they moved in with his aunt. He could not receive any education at school during this period. It was miserable there because their aunt couldn’t provide for them due to her age. Three months later, he returned to Mostaganem and he went back to school. In 1944, he received a diploma from the school. His father wanted him to get a job as soon as he received his diploma, but one of his teachers gave him a year of respite so he did not have to settle for a job he did not enjoy. In 1944, Khadda found a job at a printing company, in the region of Ain Sefra. During the day, he would sketch patterns, then he would work on his paintings at night. Furthermore, he decided to take on a second job in the evening, binding books for different writers such as Omar Khayyam, Abdou Mohammed, Taha Hussein, Hafid, Jami, André Gide, André Breton, and Jean Cocteau. He was taught drawing, while attending classes that were paid by his superior.

In 1948, along with his friend Abdallah Benanteur, Mohammed Khadda explored the various art collections presented at the Musée des Beaux-Arts in the capital city Algiers, where he was able to find his first bits of inspiration as a future painter. He was mostly influenced by the romantic painters Eugène Delacroix, or Théodore Chassériau.

During the years of resistance against the French, many artists including Khadda went and fought for the National Liberation Army. After finishing with the army, he settled down and his career as an artist slowly began.

=== Life in Paris ===
In the early 1950s, while the Algerian resistance was intensifying, Khadda spent most of his time in the Paris, along with Benanteur. Mohammed Khadda attended the Académie de la Grande Chaumière. While he learned more about art, he was also working at various print shops, and exploring the culture of Paris.

Khadda later became intensively involved in the liberation of his country, and joined the French Communist party to stand for the Algerian Liberation, in 1953. While living in Paris, he was exposed to a diverse set of cultures, communities, traditions, which sharpened his artistic eye. He was introduced to Eurocentric art movements such as Abstract Art, as well as "African sculptures and East-Asian ink works", given the Pluriculturalism of the city. Khadda was also part of the "Algerian Intellectual Circle" while living in France, and was said to be politically involved with the Algerian independence movement. This circle also enabled him to encounter other Algerian artists from diverse fields, such as Mustapha Kaid, Kateb Yacine and Mustapha Kateb.

=== Return to Algeria ===
In 1963, he returned to Algeria, a year after its Liberation, where he lived in Blida. In 1964, he became member of the Union Nationale des Arts Plastiques (The National Union of Plastic Arts) founded in 1963, under the patronage of the Ministry of Culture and Information, and the Front de Libération Nationale (National Liberation Front). In 1972, he resigned from his printing job, and dedicated the rest of his life to painting. He was appointed as advisor to the Ministry of Culture’s graphic arts sector in 1979, and became a member of the Conseil National de la Culture (National Council of Culture) in 1990.

In 1991, he died in Algiers. It is argued that he was one of the founders of contemporary art in Algeria. His art is still celebrated after his death as well, as shown in "Horizons Maghrébins- Le droit à la mémoire", or in "Les Casbahs ne s'assiègent pas".

== Art ==
While working with palettes of earth tones and bright, pure colors, Khadda created tactile compositions that layer Arabic writing and calligraphy over atmospheric abstract canvases. Using calligraphy as the essential form of Art, while enhancing its visual features mostly constitutes part of the artistic chef d'oeuvres produced by Khadda, which is entitled Hurufiyah.

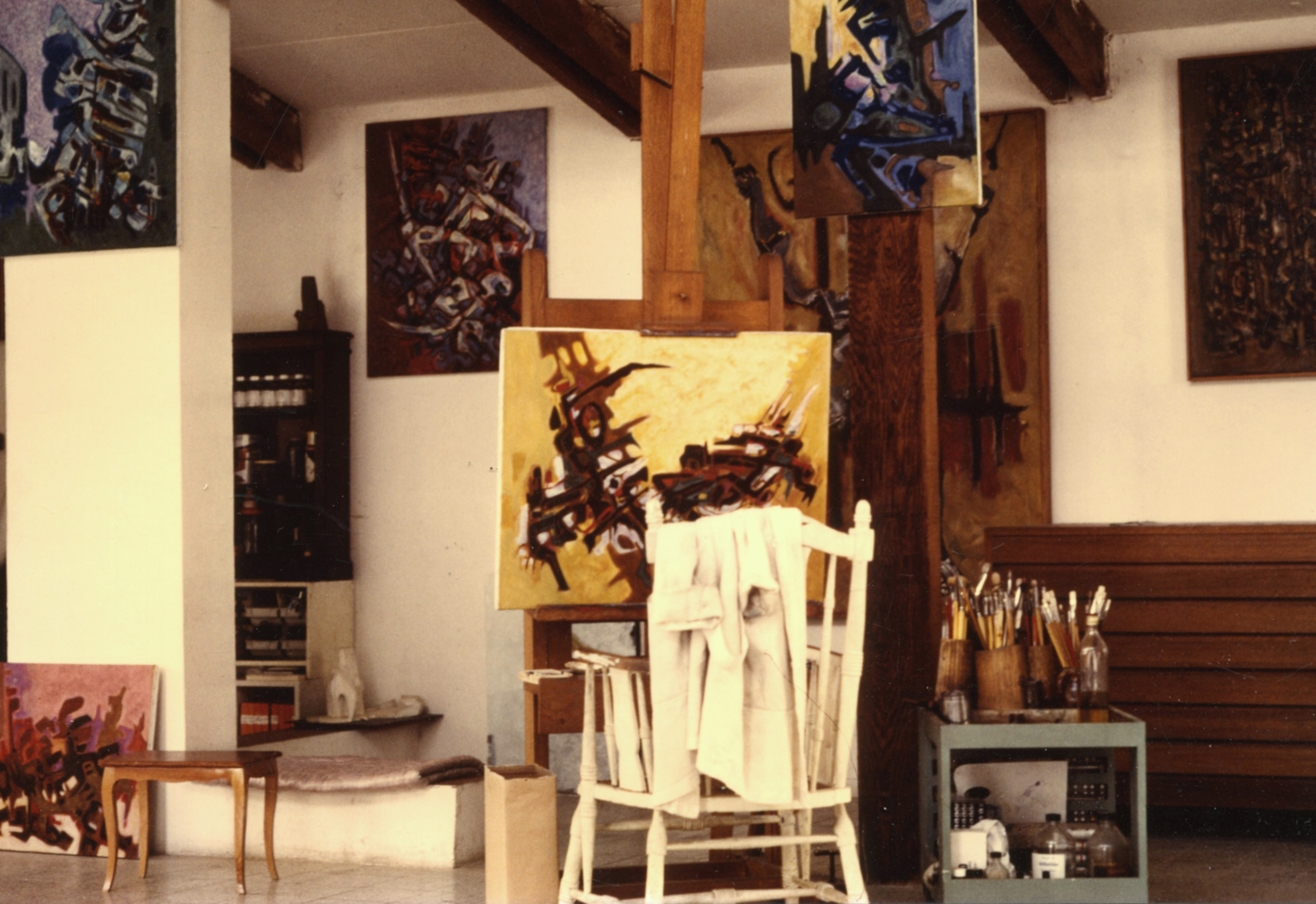
Khadda's Workshop, 1986

Mohammed Khadda was a self-taught painter of abstract compositions. Later on in his life, he was able to pursue further art education. Throughout part of his education, he worked along with his friend, Abdallah Benanteur. At the Académie des Beaux-Arts in Algiers, he studied Orientalist art, as well as the popular European art features, which was implemented in the curriculum by the French colonizers. Later on, as he settled in Paris, Khadda was exposed to other diverse forms of arts and cultures, such as Abstract art, African sculptures, East-Asian ink works as well as Islamic art. He dived deeper into his learning of art by studying the artistic archives at the Bibliothèque Nationale Française (BNF). His work illustrates these rich influences, which he further explained in his essay Elements pour un Art Nouveau.

Mohammed Khadda used his voice, and his art as a tool for expressing his political viewpoints, and making sure his political messages reached as many people as possible. His first major publication in his artistic career, Elements pour un Art nouveau, was published in 1966 and aimed to promote the reconstruction of Art in Algeria in a post-colonial society. He also participated to the art movement Aouchem (Arabic for tattoo), which was initiated in 1967, where artists would design Amazigh art, inspired by their emblematic, traditional tattoos that the Amazigh community wears. His contributions towards the political state of Algeria through his art, are still meaningful to this day, as demonstrated by Suheyla Takesh and Lynn Gumpert in their art exhibition in 2020, "Taking Shape: Abstraction from the Arab World, 1950s–1980s". Scholars, such as Professor Dina Ramadan at Bard College, also use his art as a way of reflecting on the impact of colonization on societies, as she wrote in her art review of the Takesh and Gumpert exhibition. Dr. Natasha Marie Llorens, whose doctoral research is focused on Algerian post-colonial cinema, further explains in her review, Whither the sign : Mohammed Khadda in Assia Djebar's La Nouba des Femmes du Mont Chenoua, how Khadda's art is also featured in Algerian films as a means of expressing "a necessary political corrective to social realism in painting, which he felt functioned too easily as ideological propaganda".

In 1947, Khadda met Abdallah Benanteur, an artist born in Mostaganem a year after Khadda was born. After their encounter, Khadda enrolled in an École des Beaux-arts [College of Fine Arts] where he learned different art techniques such as watercolors, pastels, and paintings. He continued to expand on his painting techniques by painting scenes of meetings in bookstores and flea markets. In 1948, he and Benantaur went to visit a friend in a hospital sanatorium. It was during this visit that Khadda saw the Museum of Fine Arts where he was inspired by paintings by Eugène Delacroix, Eugène Fromentin, Théodore Chassériau, and Nasreddine Dinet. He was also influenced by sculptures by Auguste Rodin and Antoine Bourdelle.

In 1953, like many other artists from Africa, Mohammed Khadda traveled to Paris, France to continue his education. During that time, he studied under Pablo Picasso and learned the styles of Cubism which greatly influenced his art. He spent a decade in Europe before returning to Algeria. After returning, he worked to set up an art community in Algeria for young aspiring artists to hone their potential skills. In 1964, he and others established the National Union of the Visual Arts. Khadda established the Sign Painters and School of the Sign in 1967. He also illustrated books for Rachid Boudjedra, Tahar Djaout, and others.

== Important movements ==
- Mohammed Khadda was involved in many art movements and organizations throughout his career that have and will continue to influence art in Africa and the rest of the world. Some of these include:
- National Union of the Visual Arts, 1967
- Aouchem (Arabic for tattoo) Art Movement, 1967
- School of Sign, 1967
- "Sign Painters"
- Created over 70 murals in the 1970s
- Fought with the National Liberation Army during French Resistance

== Tribute ==
On March 14, 2020, Google celebrated his 90th birthday with a Google Doodle.

== See also ==
- Culture of Algeria
- Cubism
- Pablo Picasso
- Amazigh
- Abstract Art
