= Amina Zoubir =

Contemporary artist, director, and video art curator

- Born: 1983
- Occupations: Visual artist, filmmaker
- Website: https://www.aminazoubir.com/

Amina Zoubir (born 1983) is an Algerian-born French contemporary artist, filmmaker and performer. She has worked with different art mediums such as sculpture, drawing, installation art, performance and video art. Her work relates to notions of body language in specific spaces of North Africa territories.

== Early life and education ==
Amina Zoubir is an Algerian-born French visual artist. Her mother is a medical doctor and her father, Hellal Zoubir, is a painter and designer based in Algeria. She obtained a DESA degree in graphic design in 2006 at the École supérieure des beaux-arts d'Alger in Algiers. She moved to Paris, France in 2007 and graduated with a master's degree from Paris 8 University Vincennes-Saint-Denis in 2009.

== Career ==
Zoubir directed her first short documentary in 2006, entitled Take the bus and look, developing an incipient reflection on the relationship between individuals, art, and cinema in the early turmoil of a society rising after the collective trauma of a civil war.

In 2010, Zoubir published her academic research as a book entitled video art of Algerian artists - Relation de l’image et du son dans la vidéo contemporaine algérienne : une expérience en temps réel. Her research and practice question the notions of body language in specific spaces where religious, social, and political codifications are applied to define a body typology in North Africa territories.

In 2012, Zoubir directed and performed Take your place that she directed and performed in 2012 on chosen urban spaces to denounce gender issues in the Algerian society, during six feminist actions conducted as specific video in urban spaces including coffee salons, on the streets, soccer stadiums, beaches, hair salons, and in the clothing markets, where women face gender apartheid in Algiers, which broadcast on channel TV5 Monde and online on the web documentary platform Un été à Alger meaning A Summer in Algiers, produced by narrative (Paris) and Une chambre à soi (Algiers) with the support of CNC France, Centre national du cinéma et de l'image animée and medias Algérie Focus, Libération in France, Channel TV5 Monde Africa. Her exploration of female representation in North Africa shows a fundamental need for reliable images of women living in the country nowadays and female presence in public space.

Amina Zoubir is one of the five artists who represented Algeria in 2019 with the first Algerian pavilion at the 58th Venice Biennale, Venice, Italy. The Algerian pavilion was officially registered by the Ministry of Culture of Algeria at the Venice Biennale, however, few days before the opening of the Biennale, the registration was rescinded due to the unstable political situation related to Hirak, a movement of political protests manifested by the masses, which urges President Abdelaziz Bouteflika to resign on April 2, 2019, pushing the Minister of Culture to defer Algeria's official participation at Venice Biennale and to withdraw all financial support on April 4. Despite the tumuluous situation, the project of the first Algerian pavilion, Time to shine bright was conducted, with the support of private Algerian sponsors as an autonomous artists' action during the 58th Venice Biennale from May 9 to November 24, 2019.

== Awards ==
Amina Zoubir was awarded the price Varenne FIGRA France in 2013, with a special mention for her performances Take your place, A Summer in Algiers, web documentary, which she directed in 2012 in Algiers, Algeria.

=== Public Art Collections ===
The artworks produced from Amina Zoubir's practice and research have been included in public and private collections of art foundations and museums.

- Sundsvall Photo Museum, 2025, Sundsvall, Sweden
- MAU Museum of African Art, 2024, Belgrade, Serbia
- Smithsonian Artist Fellowship, Museum of African Art, 2023, Washington DC, USA
- Sharjah Art Foundation, 2022, Sharjah, UAE
- Markk Museum, Museum am Rothenbaum Kulturen und Künste der Welt, April 28 to July 28, 2021, Hamburg, Germany.
- Etnografiska Museet, 2020, Stockholm, Sweden
- Collection Tilder, 2019, Paris, France
- Collection Gervanne and Matthias Leridon, 2018 Paris, France
- FRAC Occitanie, Fond Régional d'Art Contemporain, Les Abattoirs, 2017, Toulouse, France
- Foundation DONWAHI, 2016, Abidjan, Ivory Coast
- Foundation of African Artists for Development, 2015, Paris, France.

=== Filmography ===
- Last pop dance before darkness, 30 min, HD Pal color, sound, 2014–2016.
- Love all women like you love your mother, 4 min, Pal color, sound, 2018.
- Living in Utopia, video, 10 min, Pal color, sound, 2017.
- Take Your Place - Prends ta place, webdocumentary A Summer in Algiers - Un été Alger, produced by Narrative Paris and Une chambre à soi Algiers, with support of CNC France, 40 min, HD Pal color, sound, 2012, six performances in urban spaces at Algiers, Algeria.
- In which world do you want to be born, video, 2 min, Pal color, sound, 2011.
- Psychedelic women, video, 10 min, Pal color, sound, 2008–2010.
- The city is one of us, in collaboration with Yossi Atia, Love Difference and Foundation Pistoletto, documentary, 10 min, Pal color, sound, 2008.
- Take the Bus and look - Prends le bus et regarde, documentary, 12 min, Pal color, sound, 2006.

== Exhibitions ==
=== Solo exhibitions ===
- Archaeology of the colonized body, Markk Museum, Museum am Rothenbaum Kulturen und Künste der Welt April 28 to July 28, 2021, Hamburg, Germany.
- Taking a stance on berber queens, Södertälje Konsthall, April 27 to June 27 April 27-June 27, 2020, Södertälje, Sweden.
- The Forgotten figures, Rikstolvan Art Center, September 19-November 1, 2020 Jarrestad Simrishamn, Sweden.
- Arab sexshop, Espace d’Art 87, 2016, Paris, France.
- Take your place, A Summer in Algiers, Cinémathèque Tanger, 2013, Tangiers, Morocco.
- Psychedelic women: the middle Eastern body languages, PasaJist Gallery, 2012, Istanbul, Turkey.

=== Group exhibitions and biennials ===
2011 - 2025

- SUPERMARKET 2025, Stockholm Sweden, April 3-6, 2025.
- Gwangju Biennale, Africa Pavillon, Dream Scape [27] curator Lassana Igo Diarra & Dayana Vafina, Gwangju, South Korea, September 7th to December 10th 2024.
- Il Cono d'Ombra, FM Center for Contemporary Art, Castel Nuovo, June 25 to August 25, 2022, Naples, Italy.
- Lahore Biennale, Second edition, installation Muscicapidae January 26 to February 29, 2020, curator Sheikha Hoor Al Qasimi, Lahore, Pakistan.
- Nobel Week Lights, installation Albert Camus Light's up Je n’ai jamais pu renoncer à la lumière - Jag kunde aldrig ge upp ljuset, Kulturhuset Stadsteatern, with Nobel Prize Museum, Institut Français de Suède and Helmet, 5–13 December 2020, Stockholm, Sweden.
- 1:54 African Art Fair, Primo Marella Gallery, 2020, Marrakech, Morocco.
- Time To Shine Bright, Algerian Pavilion, Biennale d’Arte di Venezia, Venice Biennale 2019, Italy, May 9-November 24, 2019.
- Cairo Biennale, Eyes East Bound, installation Muscicapidae, 13th edition at the Palace of Arts, curator Ehab El Laban, Cairo Egypt, June 10 to August 10, 2019.
- Lumières d’Afriques, Musée d’Art Contemporain Mohamed VI, Rabat, Maroc, April 2 to August 15, 2019.
- MAXXI, Musée Nationale d’Art Contemporain du 21e siècle, Rome Italy, African Metropolis, an imaginary city, curator Simon Njami and Elena Motisi, June - November 2018, Rome, Italy.
- Dak’Art Dakar Biennale, The red hour, curator Simon Njami, Palais de Justice Dakar, May to June 2018, Dakar, Senegal.
- Lagos Photo Festival, Regimes of Truths, curator Azu Nwagbogu, November- January, 2017, Lagos, Nigeria.
- Lagos Biennale, Living on the edge, October 2017, Lagos, Nigeria.
- Afriques Capitales, Vers le cap de bonne espérance, curator Simon Njami, Gare Saint Sauveur, April 2017, Lille, France.
- Centre Pompidou, Performance Aerobic Philosophic by Pascal Lièvre, 2016, Paris, France.
- AKAA, Also Known As Africa, Foire d’art Contemporain d’Afrique, November 2016, Carreau du Temple, Paris, France.
- L’Iris de Lucy, Musée départementale d’art contemporain Rochechouart, June 2016, Rochechouart, France.
- El Iris de Lucy, MUSAC Museum of contemporary art, January 2016, León, Spain.
- Something Else, curator Simon Njami, OFF Biennale Caire, Darb1718, November 2015, Cairo, Egypt.
- Lumières d’Afriques, Théatre Nationale de Chaillot, November 2015, Paris, France.
- Addis FotoFest, 3e édition, Festival de la photographie, Addis Abeba, September 2014, Ethiopia.
- Biennale H2O Actuel Art, curated by Feria+Vincent, Modern Art Museum of republic of Sakha, Yakoutsk, August 2014, Russia.
- Torrance Art Museum, Time is Love, curator Kisito Assangni, September 2013, California, USA.
- Palais de Tokyo, Launch of video performance Take Your Place, A Summer in Algiers, during Triennale Intense proximité, curator Okwui Enwezor, June 24, 2012, Paris, France.
- FEMLINK Wonder 2011, Fondation Artos, Nicosi, Chyprus and TAC, Eindhoven, Netherlands.

2004 - 2010

- Panorama des Cinémas du Maghreb, Prend le bus et regarde, April 2010, Saint Denis, France.
- Diffusion des Cinémas Arabes, Cinéma(s) d’Algérie, AFLAM, May 2009, Marseille, France.
- Biennale Internationale d’art contemporain Pontevedra, 30e édition, sans frontières : convergences hispanomaghrébines, June 2008, Pontevedra, Spain.
- Biennale des Jeunes Créateurs d’Europe et de Méditerranée BJCEM, 13e édition, Bari, Italy. The city is one of us, Foundation Michelangelo Pistoletto, June 2008, Bari, Italy.
- Exhibition Regards des photographes Arabes au Musée public national d’Art moderne et contemporain d’Alger (MAMA) capitale du monde Arabe par Institut du monde arabe, 2008, Paris, France.
- Festival du Court-Métrage de Clermont-Ferrand, Marché du court, 2008, France.
- Screening, Take the bus and look, Filmathèque ZINET, April 2006, Algiers, Algeria.
- Biennale Internationale de Design Saint-Etienne, 2004, France.
- In memory of director Ahmed ASSELAH and his son Rabah ASSELAH, murdered at the École supérieure des beaux-arts d'Alger on March 5, 1994, during civil war. Exhibition at ESBA 2004, Algiers, Algeria.

=== Conferences ===
- Conference The Arts in Algeria nowadays, Institut du Monde Arabe, Paris, France, Arab Thought Foundation, Beyrouth, Libanon, May 20, 2025.
- Conference at iaspis konstnärsnämnden Stockholm, Sweden with Karen Milbourne, Senior Curator at Smithsonian Institution, National Museum of African Art, Washington D.C USA.
- Interview at French Institute Of Sweden, Stockholm, Sweden.
- TV5 Monde, L'invité de Patrick Simonin, with Malala Andrialavidrazana, about the exhibition Lumières d'Afriques
- France Culture Radio, Ping Pong Interview, Amina Zoubir et Jayro Bustamante: Femmes rebelles d’Algérie et du Guatemala, Paris, France.
- Forum Libération, Débat Alger : nouvelle génération? Villa Méditerranée, Marseille, France.
- Resistance et creation, debate moderated by journalist Ariane Allard with Lydie Salvayre, Hala Mohammad, Wassyla Tamzali, Alessandra Celesia and Amina Zoubir at Festival Films Femmes Méditerranée, organized by ARTE - Actions Culturelles, September 28, 2013, Villa Méditerranée, Marseille, France
- Debate Nouveaux Cinémas d’Afrique, Décoloniser les imaginaires: La Fabrique du Réel Dans Les Nouveaux cinémas d’Afrique, Les Ateliers Varan, 2013, Paris, France.
- Conference at Institut des cultures d'Islam, Festival Viva l’Algérie, January 2013, Paris, France

== Bibliography ==
=== Exhibition catalogues ===
- Lahore Biennale, 2020, Lahore, Pakistan.
- Biso Biennale, 2020, Ouagadougou, Burkina Faso.
- Cairo Biennale, Eyes East Bond, Cairo, Egypt.
- Time to shine bright, first Algerian pavilion at 58th Venice Biennale in 2019, Italy, edited by Editions HELIUM Algeria
- Dakar Biennale, Dak'Art 2018, Palais de Justice de Dakar, Senegal
- African Metropolis, An imaginary city, group exhibition of African artists, MAXXI NATIONAL MUSEUM OF 21ST CENTURY ARTS, 2018, Rome, Italy, Editor Kehrer Verlag, Germany.
- Afrique Capitales, Vers le Cap de bonne espérance, group exhibition of African artists, La Villette Paris, Gare Saint Sauveur, Lille, France,2017, Editor Kehrer Verlag, Germany.
- Lucy's Iris, group exhibition of African women artists, MUSAC Museum, 2016–2017, León, Spain.
- Lumières d'Afriques, group exhibition of African artists, Théâtre Nationale de Chaillot, 2015, Paris, France.

=== Publications ===
- Black Camera n°6 Women on the Algerian Art Scene: Interrogating the Postcolonial Gaze through Documentary and Video Art, article by Delphine Letort and Emmanuelle Cherel. Indiana University Press Board of Directors, 2014, Indiana, USA.
- Algerian Artists Write the Video Body 1995–2013, Nafas Magazine, 2014, online on Universes in Universe.
- Le génie empêché par les médiocres, The genius impeded by the mediocre, about the movie Tahya Ya Dido, Mohamed Zinet (1971, 76 min) at Laboratoire d’Aubervilliers, 2013, France.
- Monde du Cinéma, number 3, Art video algérien: une experience en temps réel, review release in April 2013 at Paris, France.
- Book release Relationship of image and sound in contemporary Algerian Video: Experience real-time European University Editions, 2010, Germany.
- Journal of the Foundation Michelangelo Pistoletto, About video documentary, Take the bus and look, 2010, Cittadellarte, Biella, Italy.

=== Collaborations ===
- Utocorpis, curatorial programme, video art, films et vidéos d’artistes français et africains, 2017, French Institute Casablanca, Morocco.
- Utocorpis, les corps utopiques, Silencio Club David Lynch, 2017, Paris, France.
- Delirium, vidéos d’artiste africains, French Institute Dakar, 2016, Senegal.
- Curating exhibition Le corps manquant - The missing body, 2014, French Institute Algiers, Algeria.
- Corps et (des) accords. L’Esthétique vidéo des artistes algériennes (1995–2013), Cycle Possession, Espace Khiasma, 2013, curatorial programme of video art, Paris Les Lilas, France.
- Curating exhibition La scène algérienne, Hospice Saint Charles, January 2013, Rosny-sur-seine, France.
- Illegal Cinema 113, screening movie Tahya ya dido, directed by par Mohamed Zinet (1971, 76 min), Laboratoires d’Aubervilliers, 2013, Paris, France.
- Methods and processes of change, Foundation Michelangelo Pistoletto and Association Love Difference, 2010, Biella, Italy.
- French Connexion edited by Léa Gauthier, Black Jack Editions, 2008, Paris, France.
- Du sacré dans l’art actuel?, edited by Richard Conte et Marion Laval Jeantet, Klincksieck Editions, 2008, Paris, France.
