= Zohra Bensemra =

Algerian photographer (born 1968)

- Born: October 1968 (age 58); Algiers, Algeria
- Occupation: Photojournalist
- Years active: 1990–present
- Employer: Reuters
- Known for: Coverage of conflicts in the Middle East, Africa and Asia
- Notable work: Tunisian Revolution (2011), South Sudanese independence referendum (2011), Libyan Civil War (2011), Mosul War (2017)
- Awards: European Union Prize for Best African Photographer (2005); The Guardian Agency Photographer of the Year (2017); UNICEF Honorable Mention (2017)

Zohra Bensemra (born October 1968) is an Algerian photographer who works in the Middle East, Africa and Asia. She is currently based in Africa.

== Biography ==
Zohra Bensemra was born in Algiers, Algeria, in October 1968. She grew up seeing her older brother take amateur pictures. Around the age of six, she started imitating him and taking his cameras when he was not at home. One day her brother found out what she had been doing and screamed at her, but later got her a small camera for herself and she started by taking pictures of her classmates.

Bensemra has worked as a photojournalist since 1990. She stated in her Reuters profile that she first felt like a photographer in 1995: the first time she ever saw dead bodies in her life. There had been a car bombing in the center of Algerian capital, close to the police station and her workplace. The first thing she saw was the body of a burnt woman on the ground. The next day she woke up and felt the calling to become a real photographer. She firmly believes that in order to succeed, especially in jobs like photojournalism, one has to learn to accept the challenges that come with it. She first worked for Reuters as a stringer during the Algerian Civil War in 1997. In 2000 she covered the conflict between the Albanians and the Serbs in Macedonia. She was assigned to Iraq in 2003. While working in Najaf, she became a staff photographer for Reuters. She covered the South Sudanese independence referendum, 2011, the Tunisian Revolution, the 2011 Libyan Civil War, and the Mosul war in 2017. She was based as Reuters Chief Photographer in Pakistan (2012-2015) and is currently based in Africa as its West Africa chief photographer.

The Tunisian Revolution, Bensemra stated, was the assignment that left the biggest mark on her because she never thought the day would come when the Tunisians would rebel against their ruler, given how controlled the state was. She arrived in Tunis on January 14, 2011, right when a large group of people gathered outside the interior ministry demanding President Zine al-Albidine Ben Ali's resignation.

In 2011, Bensemra's photographs were displayed at the Deutsche Bank building in Frankfurt, Germany. The bank's Global Head of Art, Friedhelm Hütte, commented: "Bensemra is an important artist to us as she knows how to cut through the borders of the mind to leave a lasting and meaningful impression. She has a great ability to show the underlying background stresses and problems in the conflicts of the moment." In 2012, she visited and took photos in Syria.

Her work usually covers "conflict, humanitarian issues, and stories about women and politics" and is largely based in countries suffering from internal conflict – social, economic, or humanitarian. Bensemra stated that her goal when photographing events is to promote a better understanding of the conflict to challenge those in power to improve the situation. Her preferred assignments are stories related to people's struggle for citizenship and human rights against dominating forces.

In 2017, Bensemra was chosen as agency photographer of the year by the picture desk of The Guardian.

== Awards ==
- 2005: Winner, European Union prize for the best African photographer.
- 2017: The Guardian picture desk agency photographer of the year.
- 2017 UNICEF honorable mentions
