= National Museum of Fine Arts of Algiers =

Museum in Algiers, Algeria

Coordinates: 36°44′46″N 3°04′20″E

Musée des Beaux-Arts d'Alger
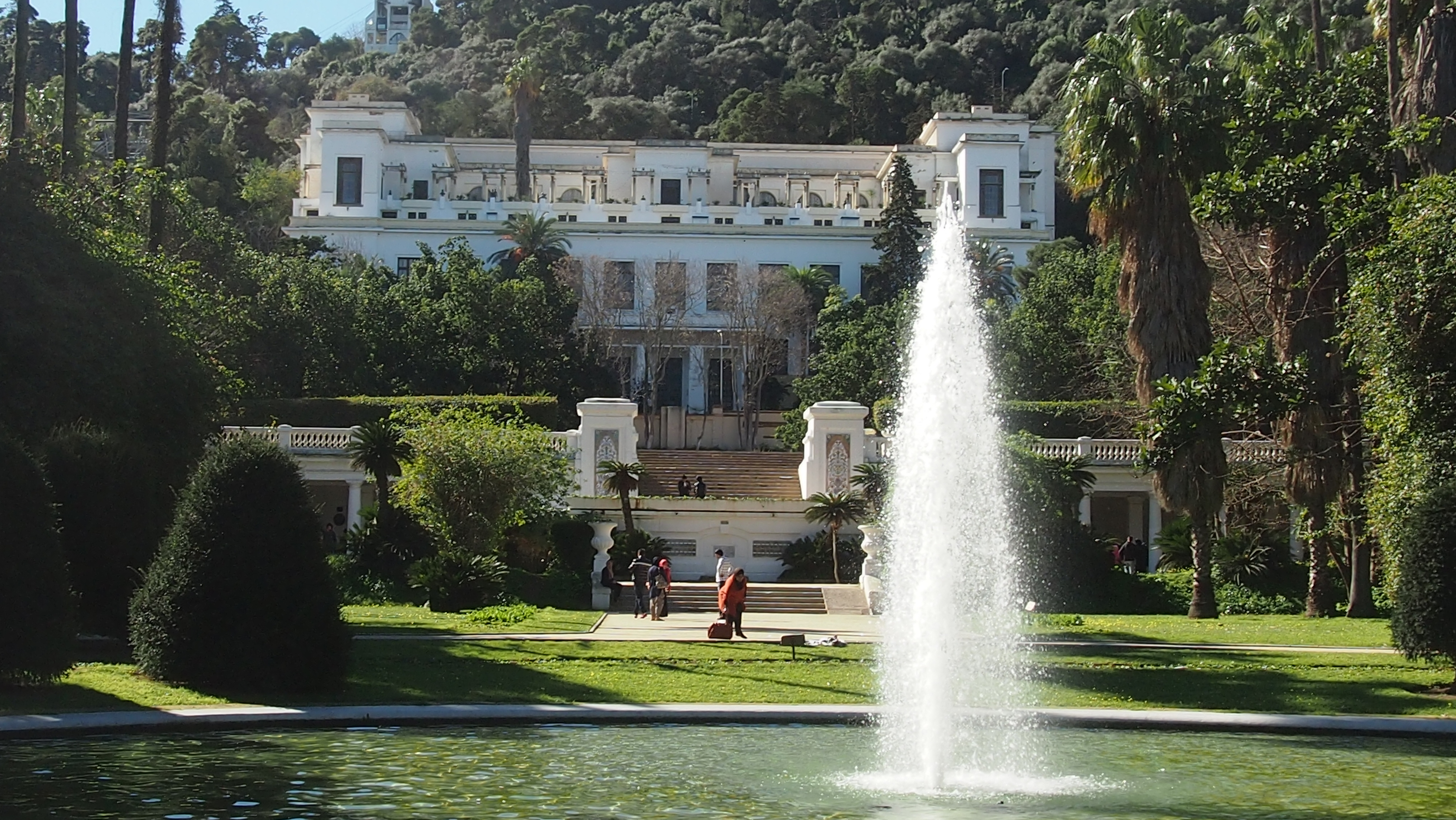
- Facade of imposing building of Musée des Beaux-Arts d'Alger
- Established: May 5, 1930; 96 years ago
- Location: Algiers
- Type: Art museum
- Director: Dalila Orfali
- Architect: Paul Guion
- Website: www.musee-beauxarts.dz

The National Museum of Fine Arts in Algiers (French: Musée national des Beaux-Arts d'Alger) is one of the largest art museums in Africa. Opened to the public since 5 May 1930, it is located in the Hamma district, next to the Hamma test garden.

The museum, with its 8,000 works, includes paintings, drawings, engravings and old prints, sculptures, old furniture and decorative art, ceramics, glassware, as well as a numismatic collection. Among the works on display are paintings by Dutch and French masters such as Brugghen, Van Uyttenbroeck, Van Goyen, Monet, Matisse, Delacroix, Honoré Daumier, Renoir, Gauguin and Pissarro. But also emblematic Algerian artists, such as Baya, Yellès and Racim. The museum houses sculptures by Rodin, Bourdelle and Belmondo. On 14 May 1962 over 300 works of art were brought to the Louvre in Paris from the Museum.

== National Museum of Fine Arts of Algiers and Algerian Independence ==
The Museum of Fine Arts came under threat as independence approached. As part of their campaign of destabilization, on 26 November 1961 Organisation Armée Secrète (OAS) commandos bombed a statue by Antoine Bourdelle in the courtyard of the museum causing damage to the museum's first floor as well as the statue. Additionally there was a fear among French cultural authorities that strict Islamists would take offense to nudes kept in the museum and/or that post-independence rioting and looting would affect the museum. French authorities saw the immediate danger posed by the OAS and apparent danger of anarchy (the museum experienced a peaceful transition) as a reason to move the works of art in secret, under military escort first to Marseille and finally to the Louvre in Paris.

The works were valued at the time to be worth, in today's dollars $50 million. However, despite close ties with the museum, no cultural representatives of the FLN, or indeed workers at the museum were informed of the transfer when it occurred and only discovered the missing pieces when they found empty frames. When the missing works were discovered the Fine Arts Museums director, Jean de Maisonseul informed the French. This shipment included works by such artists as Monet, Delacroix and Courbet. The negotiations over returning the art, and whether it should indeed be returned to Algeria were a contentious issue in France and a cause of outrage in Algeria.

Under the Evian accords of March 1962 it was agreed that all institutions and infrastructure which had under colonial administration been financed by the autonomous colonial administration in Algeria would remain under the control of the Algerian State. The argument of the Algerian negotiators for this technicality was that these institutions, museums included had been financed from the resources produced by the Algerian land and its people. Both the head of the Louvre and of the curator of the Museum of Fine Arts (who remained the same as under French administration) worked to bring the works back under Algerian control. The Director of France's museums Henri Seyrig argued that returning the work, in accord with the Evian Agreements would continue to remind Algerians of their ties to France and would follow a foreign policy brief stating an intention to "foster the most extensive audience for our culture" as an extension of politics by other means. while the Minister of Foreign Affairs, Michel Debré saw it as France's cultural property, and a part of its territory that must be returned. Negotiations began in May 1967 and by 1970, over the protests of the Minister Michel Debré, the works were repatriated to Algeria. Cooperation between museum officials was one of the few examples of goodwill negotiating on both sides.

== Collections ==
=== Paintings ===
The paintings department has European paintings of 14th- to mid-20th-century paintings. They are arranged chronologically and by major schools in 35 rooms. The collection features :

- Alfred Sisley, The Canal du Loing in Winter
- Bettina Heinen-Ayech, Arc de Triomphe de Thibilis, Maouna en été, la dense des oliviers, Coquelicots

== History of the museum ==
=== The beginnings ===
The Algiers Museum of Fine Arts was created by politicians at the end of the 19th century, during the period of French Algeria. Originally it was in the dilapidated premises of the Société des beaux-arts founded by Hippolyte Lazerges in 1875 that the municipality of Algiers kept its works of art. It was not until 1897 that it acquired a real museum, devoted to the ancient and Muslim collections, even though it was housed in the buildings of a teacher training college. In 1908, a former army barracks located on the present site of the Safir Hotel was dedicated to art. It was inaugurated on 30 May 1908 and this creation had been requested for a long time because the Fine Arts room that served as a museum was very badly laid out and could not contain the works acquired by the municipality. This new municipal museum was directed until 1910 by Charles de Galland, but it was dilapidated and not very functional. The quality of the museum was not sufficient, so much so that travellers and the people of Algiers disdained and ignored the so-called "municipal" museum, which was located in an unfavourable, dilapidated, not very accessible place, even more poorly surrounded than poorly lit. Thus, the municipal museum of Algiers closed its doors after twenty years of operation between 1908 and 1928. A national museum of fine arts took over its collection, enriching it with new acquisitions.

=== The birth of the Musée des Beaux-Arts ===
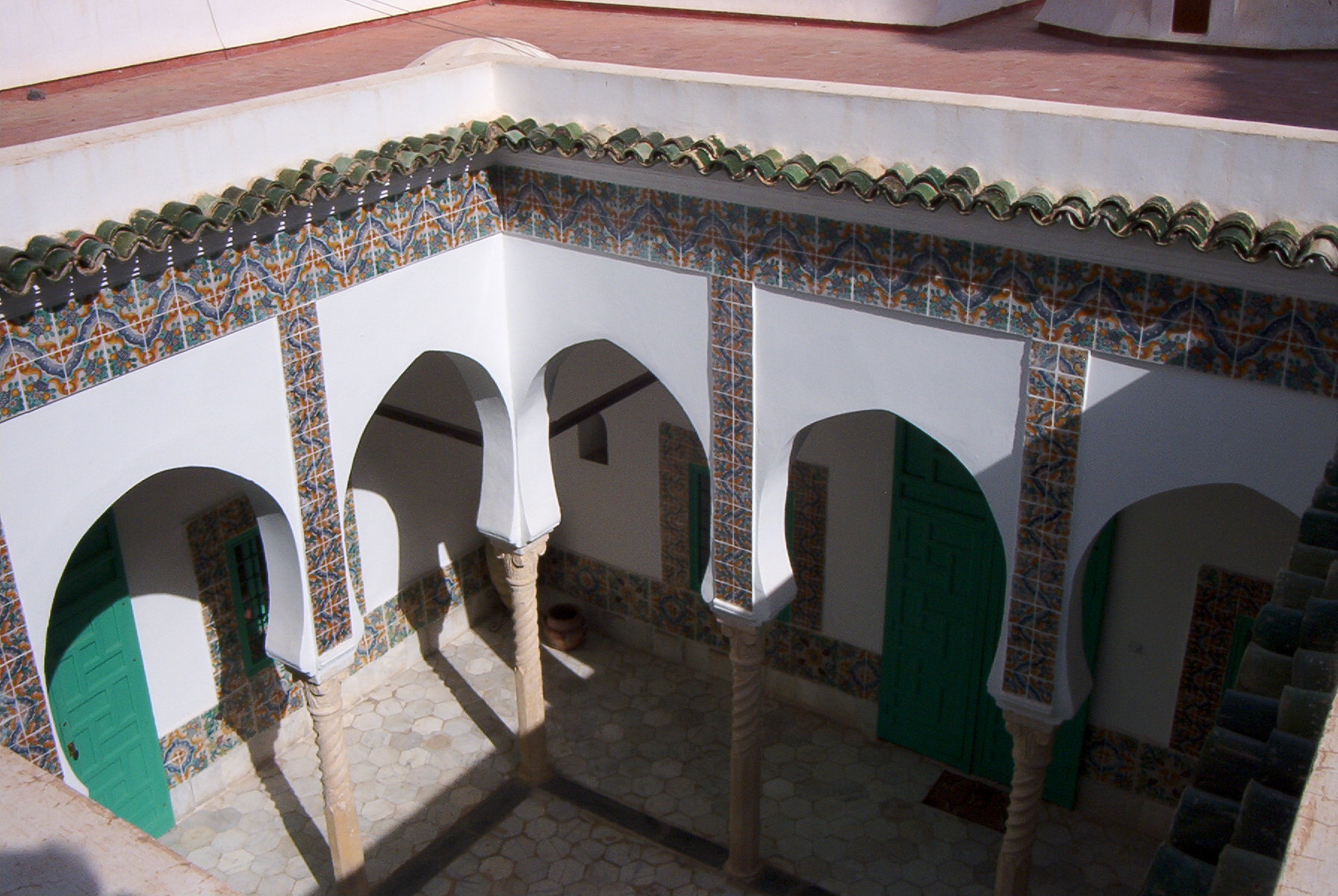

With the opening of the "Villa Abd-el-Tif", a real need in this field is felt and the project is entrusted to a little known architect, Paul Guion. The site is chosen, in Hamma, opposite the Jardin d'essai and not far from the Abd-el-Tif villa, on the hill of the wild boars. Paul Guion opted for a symmetrical and rectilinear monumentalism whose architectural elements drawn from Mediterranean art were to be echoed in the admirable furniture designed and drawn by Louis Fernez, a professor at the National School of Fine Arts in Algiers, some of whose pieces were commissioned from the designer Francis Jourdain. Begun in 1928, the work was quickly completed, thanks to credits that were generously granted. The architecture of the museum was much admired for its ideal location and its style of combining "past and present". This architectural style symbolises the construction of the image of a young and modern country, but also one that is mindful of its traditions. The immense size of the new museum is worthy of consideration: thirty-five painting rooms, a sculpture gallery, a casting gallery, a library and a print room. The building is divided into three floors: on the ground floor is the moulding room, on the first floor the modern sculpture room and on the upper floor the painting galleries. The Algiers Fine Arts Museum, inaugurated on 5 May 1930, was not opened to the public until April 1931. It was the centenary of Algeria that promoted this project of the National Museum of Fine Arts in Algiers. Celebrating its colonies, celebrating its victories in the Great War, the France of the Third Republic could not ignore the first centenary of its presence in Algeria. Prepared as early as 1923 under the aegis of the governor, General Steeg, a magnificent prelude to the Vincennes Exhibition was set up by a law of 1928 which created a High Council and a General Commission for the Centenary. The aim was to show what France had achieved in Algeria since its installation, the results obtained and the progress made. A budget originally set at 134 million was reduced to 82 million and in metropolitan France, all the goodwill was put into spreading the good word of French Algeria. Among these festive activities, the museum projects were promoted most considerably; alongside the great commemorative monuments, the Fine Arts Museum, the Bardo Museum, the Forestry Museum and the Franchet d'Espérey Museum in Algiers (historical museum of the Army and military festivals, installed in the military premises of the Casbah, not far from the first ramparts of Algiers) were also inaugurated. In contrast to the other recently inaugurated museums, the structures and status of the Musée des Beaux-Arts are being revised with new missions.

=== Acquisitions and donations ===
Since this museum became national, it has been considerably enriched. The credits granted to it during the celebration of the Centenary of Algeria have enabled it to make many important purchases. By sending the old collections of the Municipal Museum to Constantine for the inauguration of its Museum of Fine Arts, the collections for the new National Museum of Algiers began to be constituted as early as 1927; it was the art historian Jean Alazard, then dean of the Faculty of Letters of Algiers, who was entrusted with this mission. On Alazard's proposal, a special commission chaired by Paul Léon and whose main members were Mouillé, deputy director of the Beaux-Arts, Jean Guiffrey and Paul Jamot, curators of the Louvre, Raymond Kœchlin, president of the Conseil des musées nationaux, and Charles Masson and Robert Rey, curators of the Luxembourg Museum, decided on the definitive purchase. Unprecedented in the museum's history, the funds allocated for the Centennial Exhibition allowed for the acquisition of 498 works in two years: eclectic acquisitions that gave pride of place to contemporary sculpture and the great names in art history.

The Museum of Fine Arts soon enjoyed a great deal of influence, enhanced by donations and wise purchases. The care and skill with which all these purchases were made can be seen. They consist of masterpieces by the great orientalists such as Alexandre-Gabriel Decamps, Eugène Delacroix, Eugène Fromentin, Théodore Chassériau and the most famous representatives of modern art: Gustave Courbet, Théodore Rousseau, Camille Pissarro, Edgar Degas, Eugène Boudin, Auguste Renoir, Alfred Sisley, Armand Guillaumin and even more contemporary artists such as Albert Marquet, Suzanne Valadon, Maurice Denis or Henri Matisse. The museum's early catalogues demonstrate the height of French art at the time and reflect the institution's aim to disseminate French art and culture. The fact that there was a historical section with beautiful deposits from the museum in Versailles demonstrates the didactic and patriotic character of the museum.

The role of local collectors cannot be overlooked in the development of the collection. In addition to new acquisitions, the museum has also received numerous donations. Donors included former patrons such as Marius de Buzon or Jean Désiré Bascoules, great settlers such as Lucien Borgeaud, industrialists such as the painter Louis Billiard, or an amateur such as Laurent Schiaffino. Among them, the famous Frédéric Lung owed his reputation not only to his early interest in the painters of the Villa Abd el-Tif but also to the rich collection of modern and impressionist works that he built up. His widow bequeathed some pieces to the Algiers Museum of Fine Arts, in particular Charles Despiau's studio plaster, L'Homme prêt à l'action. All the former residents of the Villa Abd-el-Tif were widely represented, either grouped together in special rooms or spread throughout the galleries. These representations allowed visitors to follow the evolution of the main artists who were originally from Algiers or who had been living there for a long time. From 1930 to 1960, three major acquisition periods provided the museum with an invaluable collection. Some will also make their entry to the museum at this period: Azouaou Mammeri, Mohammed Racim, Mohamed Temmam, Bachir Yellès (1949), Abdelhalim Hemche.

In this Europeanised Algiers, the Musée des Beaux-Arts functioned as an institution where cultured people did not feel out of place, but its atmosphere, which was subject to local particularities, also made it possible to detach oneself from the metropolis. The museum was much more admired by the elite than it was by the crowd. In contrast to the great museums of the metropolis, which also served as an educational field for students of fine arts, the students of the Algiers School of Fine Arts visited the museum's painting and sculpture rooms less often. This was probably due to the distance of the museum from the city centre, but it also explains why the museum may not have had the same objectives as the museums in the metropolis.

=== Le Musée des Beaux-Arts at the time of Algeria's independence ===
As the museum was attacked by the OAS on the eve of independence, some three hundred of its works were transferred to Paris in April 1962 and deposited in the Louvre Museum. Jean de Maisonseul, appointed in November 1962 as curator of the museum (which became the Musée National des Beaux-Arts d'Alger) under the heading of cooperation, at the request of the Algerian Ministry of National Education, ensured the reopening of the museum in July 1963 and led lengthy negotiations that culminated in December 1968 in the restitution of the 157 paintings and 136 drawings - "even though from the outset André Malraux, then Minister of Culture, recognised that these works belonged to Algeria", he would specify. Maisonseul, curator until 1970, simultaneously undertook through his acquisition policy to remedy the poverty of the Algerian art collection, introducing works by Baya, Benanteur, Guermaz, Khadda, Martinez and Bettina Heinen-Ayech to the museum. An important group of contemporary art works donated by the States when Algeria gained independence will be added.

== Collections of paintings ==
=== European art ===
The 14th, 15th and 16th centuries are represented by works in which two major currents are evident: the Italian school and the northern, Dutch and Flemish school. The 17th and 18th centuries are represented by the French, Italian and Dutch schools. The 19th and 20th centuries are exclusively French. Here are some of the most representative works.

==== German art ====
Non-exhaustive list

- Bartholomaeus Bruyn the Elder (1493-1555), Portrait of a Woman
- Bartholomaeus Bruyn the Younger (1530-1607), Portrait of a Woman
- Hans Rottenhammer (1564-1625), Diana and Calypso.

==== Swiss Art ====
Non-exhaustive list

- Konrad Witz (1400-1445/46), Nativité.
- Achille Koetschet (1862-1895).
- Édouard Herzig (1860-1926).

==== Spanish art ====
Non-exhaustive list

- Alonso Cano (1601-1667), Scene of religious ecstasy.
- Angel Diaz-Ojeda (1886-1968).
- Joseph Sintès (1829-1913), In the Casbah of Algiers.

==== Dutch art ====
Non-exhaustive list

- Jan van Dael (1764-1840), Still Life of Flowers in a Vase
- Hendrick ter Brugghen (1588-1629), Un chanteur s'accompagnant au luth
- Moses van Uyttenbroeck (1600-1646)
- Jan Van Goyen (1596-1656)

==== Flemish art ====
Non-exhaustive list

- Elias Vonck (1605-1652)
- Jacob Grimmer (1525-1590)
- Theobald Michau (1676-1765)
- Rembrandt (1606-1669)

==== Italian art ====
Non-exhaustive list

- Andrea Previtali (1480-1528), Portrait of a Condottiere
- Barnaba da Modena (1328-1386), Baptism of Christ (the oldest work in the museum's collection, dating from 1367)
- Giuseppe Vittore Ghislandi, known as Fra Galgario (1655-1743), Portrait of a Young Girl
- Giuseppe Maria Crespi, known as the Spagnolo (1665-1747), The Watering Place
- Giovanni Paolo Panini (1691-1765), View of the Colosseum
- Jacopo Carrucci, known as Pontormo (1494-1557), Portrait of Alexander de Medici
- Michelangelo Merisi da Caravaggio (1571-1610), Pied Piper
- Michele Marieschi (1710-1743), View of the Church of the Salute in Venice
- Romanino Girolamo (1484-1566), Saint Helena discovering the True Cross
- Sebastiano Ricci (1659-1734), The Virgin and Child Jesus surrounded by saints and angels.

==== French art ====
Non-exhaustive list

- 15th century :
  - Triptyque de l'École d'Amiens, Le Christ chez Marie-Madeleine.
- 16th century :
  - François Clouet (1515-1572), Portrait du maréchal de Vieilleville.
- 17th century :
  - Claude Gillot (1673-1722), Scène de ballet
  - Claude Vignon (1593-1670), Adoration des Mages
  - Charles de La Fosse (1636-1716), Neptune chassant les Vents
  - Jean-Baptiste Pater (1695-1736), La Balançoire
  - Louis Le Nain (1593-1648), La Fiancée normande, La Repasseuse
  - Nicolas de Largillierre (1656-1746), Portrait d'une femme en Diane
  - Sébastien Bourdon (1616-1671), Les joueurs de tric trac
  - Simon Vouet (1590-1649), David et Abigail femme de Nabal
- 18th century :
  - Antoine-Jean Gros (1771-1835),
  - Alexandre-François Desportes (1661-1743),
  - Claude Joseph Vernet (1714-1789), Bord de Mer, Effet de Brouillard
  - Edmé Bouchardon (1698-1762),
  - Jacques Louis David (1748-1825), Portrait de Marie-Françoise Buron
  - Jean Siméon Chardin (1699-1779), La Théière blanche
  - Jean-Baptiste Nattier (1678-1726), Portrait de Madame de La Poix de Fréminville
  - Jean-Étienne Liotard (1702-1789), Marie-Adélaïde de France en costume d'Orientale
  - Jean-Baptiste Hilaire (1753-1822), La Place de l'Hippodrome à Constantinople
  - Jean-Baptiste Perronneau (1715-1783)
  - Jean-Baptiste Camille Corot (1796-1875), deux toiles intitulées "Paysages d'Ile de France
  - Louis Brion de la Tour (1743-1803), Portrait du duc de beaufort
- 19th century :
  - Alfred Dehodencq (1822-1882), Noces juives
  - Auguste Renoir (1841-1919), Paysage de printemps
  - Alfred Sisley (1839-1911), Le Canal du Loing en hiver
  - Albert Lebourg (1849-1928), Café Maure du Hamma, Rouen
  - Berthe Morisot (1841-1895),
  - Camille Corot (1796-1875), Étang de Ville-d'Avray
  - Camille Pissarro (1830-1903), Femme à sa fenêtre
  - Claude Monet (1840-1926), Rochers de Belle-Isle (1886)
  - Eugène Delacroix (1798-1863), Le Giaour traversant le gué - Lion couché
  - Edgar Degas (1834-1917), Femme mettant son corset
  - Emile Bernard (1868-1941), Nature morte
  - Eugène Fromentin (1820-1876), Souvenir d'Algérie
  - Étienne Dinet (1861-1929), Petites Filles jouant et dansant
  - Édouard Herzig (1860-1926),
  - Honoré Daumier (1808-1879), Les Amateurs d'estampes
  - Hippolyte Lazerges (1817-1887), Le porteur d’eau
  - Gustave Courbet (1819-1877), Le Vieux Pont
  - Gustave Caillebotte (1848-1894), Portrait d'inconnu
  - Georges Dufrénoy (1870-1943), Place des Vosges
  - Gustave Guillaumet (1840-1887), Scène à Biskra
  - Jean-Auguste-Dominique Ingres (1780-1867), Portrait au crayon de Jean-Baptiste Cortot
  - Jean-François Millet ( 1814-1875), Nature morte aux navets
  - Johan Barthold Jongkind (1819-1891), Le Port de Honfleur
  - Pierre Puvis de Chavannes (1824-1898), Portrait de femme
  - Paul Gauguin (1848-1903), Paysage de Bretagne
  - Paul Sérusier (1864-1927), Nature morte
  - Théodore Rousseau (1812-1867), Forêt au crépuscule
  - Théodore Chassériau (1819-1856), Portrait de Rachel, Portrait présumé de la marquise de Caussade
  - Thomas Couture (1815-1879), Étude pour l'enrôlement des volontaires
- 20th century:
  - Albert Marquet (1875-1947), Place du Gouvernement à Alger
  - André Lhote (1885-1962), Paysage
  - Edouard Vuillard (1869-1940), Femme dans son intérieur
  - Henri Matisse (1869-1954), le Jardin de Renoir à Cagnes
  - Georges Rochegrosse (1859-1938), Les Trois Grâces-Nu - L'estudiantina - Jardin à El-Biar - Toits de Paris
  - Jean Launois(1898-1942), Famille de gitans Farniente, Famille juive, Jeunes Arabes
  - Léon Carré (1859-1938), Histoire d'Abou Qir et d'Abou Sir
  - Maurice Denis (1870-1943), Vallée de Josephat
  - Maurice de Vlaminck (1876-1958), Bouquet
  - Maurice Utrillo (1883-1955), Rue de Ville-Evrard
- École d'Alger :
  - Alfred Chataud (1833-1908), Mauresque à la cruche
  - Armand Assus (1892-1977), Rue du Chêne, Le Couloir bleu, Le Port de Rotterdam, Le Narguilé, Intérieur, crayon : portrait du peintre Hacène Benaboura
  - Étienne Dinet (1861-1929) Petites filles jouant et dansant, Départ à la Mecque, Vieilles Femmes, Raoucha, L’embuscade, L’aveugle
  - Émile Claro (1897-1977), Rue de la Casbah d'Alger - et la plus importante collection au monde (quasi intégrale) des primés de la Villa Abd-el-Tif
  - Jean-Aimé-Roger Durand, (1914-2001), Les Hangars, Paysage de Guyotville, Paysage La Bridja, Paysage de Delly-Ibrahim, Quartier perdu
  - Joseph Sintès (1829-1913) (nombreux dessins gouaches et aquarelles), Le Port d'Alger
  - Louis Bénisti (1903-1995), La Fête orientale, Le Port d'Alger, Paysage du Sahel, Buste de René-Jean Clot
  - Maurice Bouviolle (1893-1971) Femmes juives de Ghardaïa, Mauresques d'Alger
  - Oscar Spielmann (1902-1975), Mauresque riant
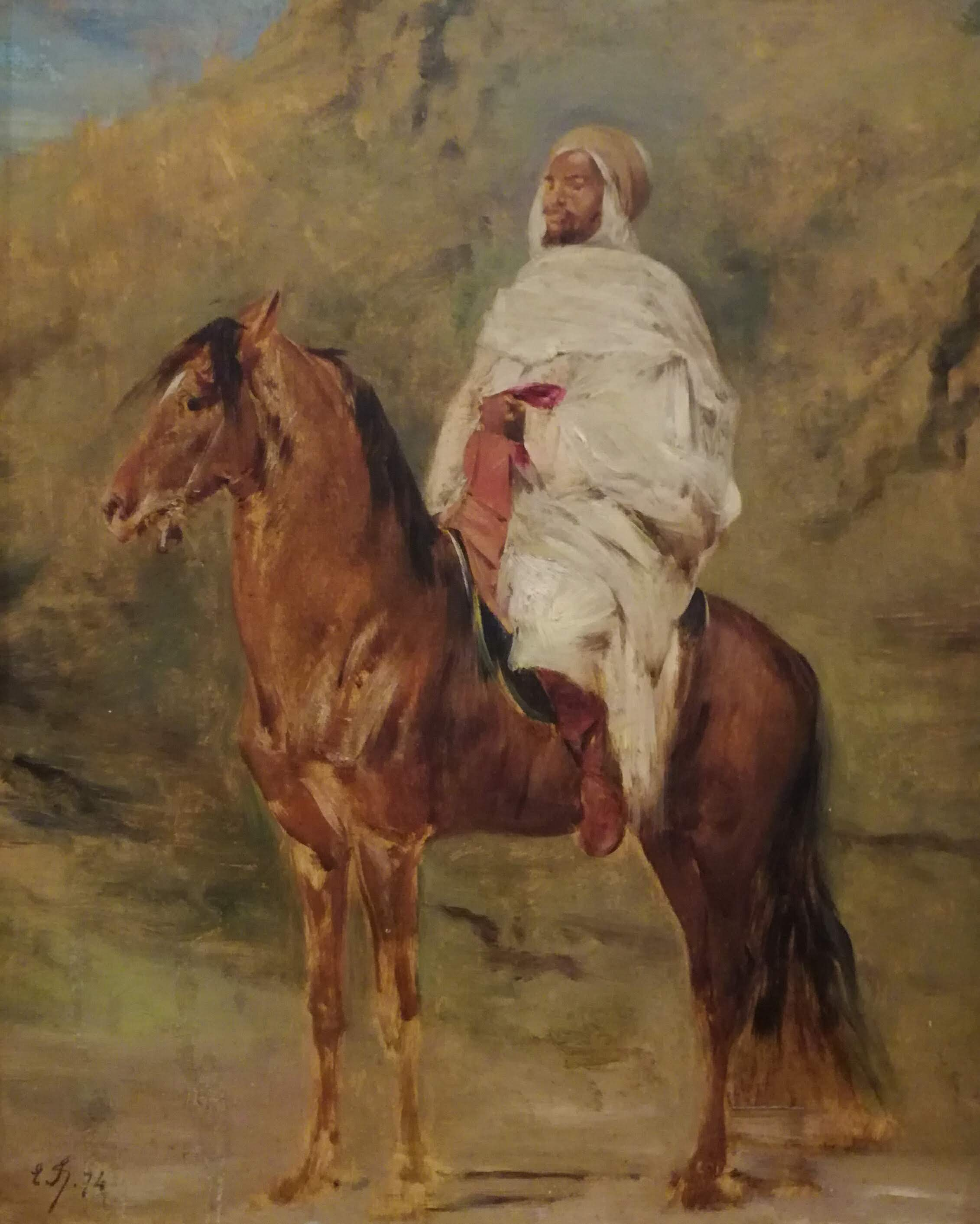
Cavalier, Eugène Fromentin.

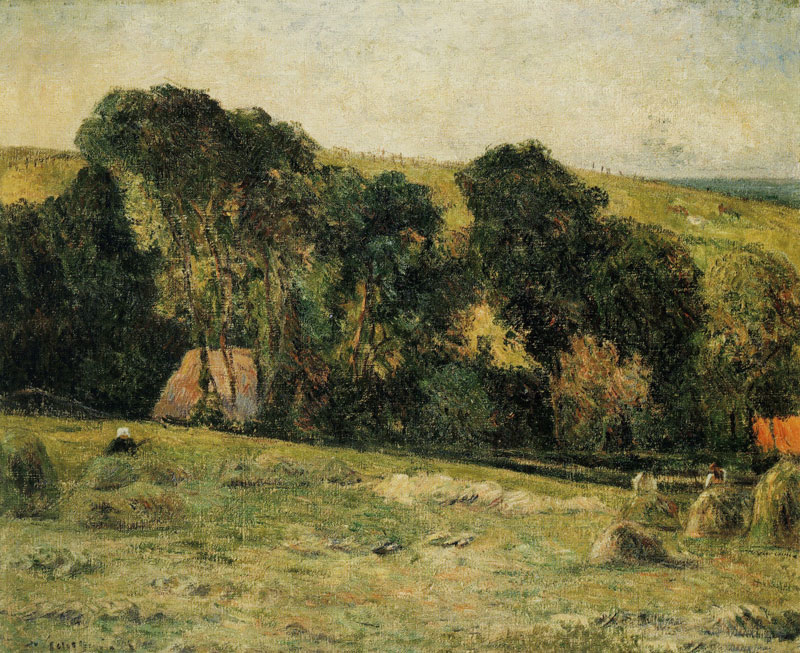
La Fenaison aux environs de Dieppe, 1885 Paul Gauguin.

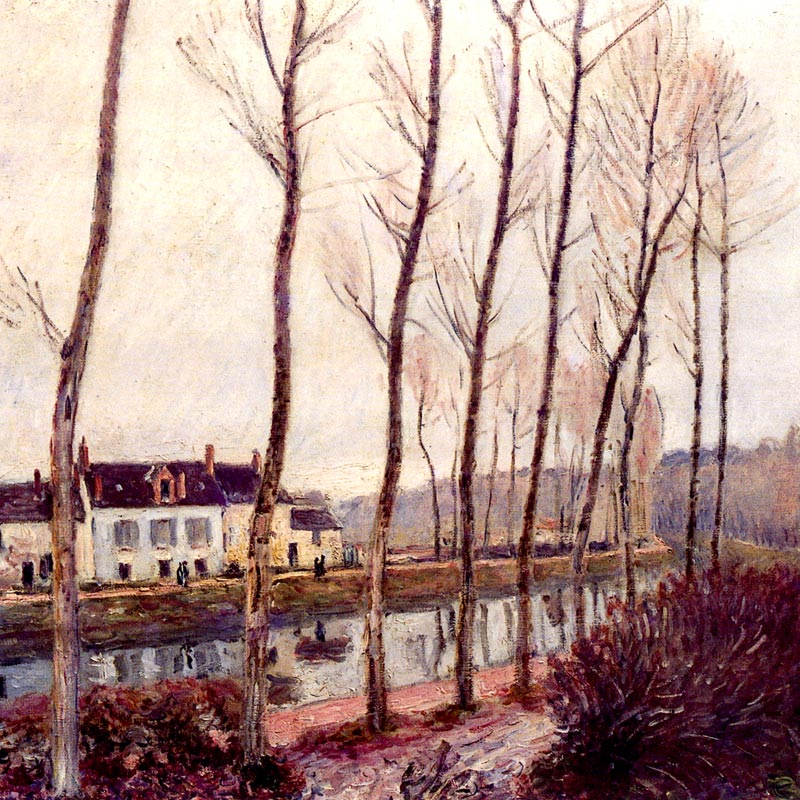
Le Canal du Loing en hiver, 1891 Alfred Sisley.

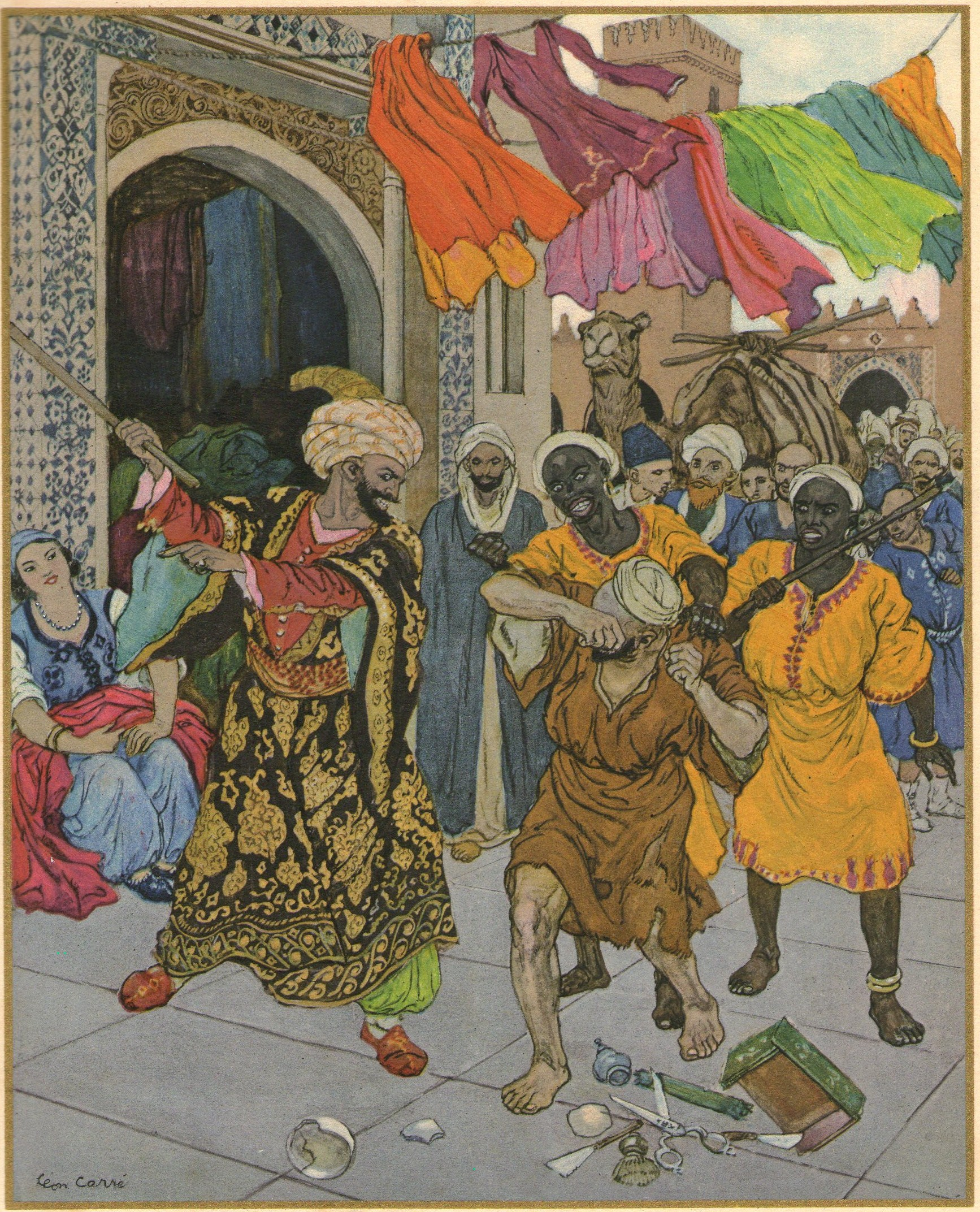
Illustration of the Thousand and One Nights book - Histoire d'Abou Qir et d'Abou Sir Léon Carré.

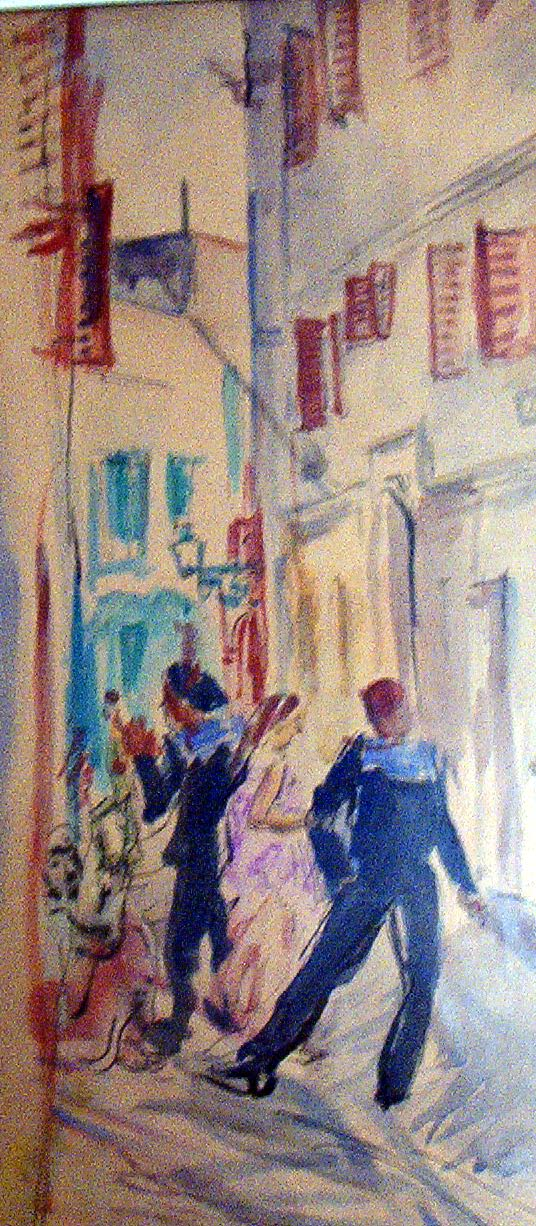
A work by Jean Launois.

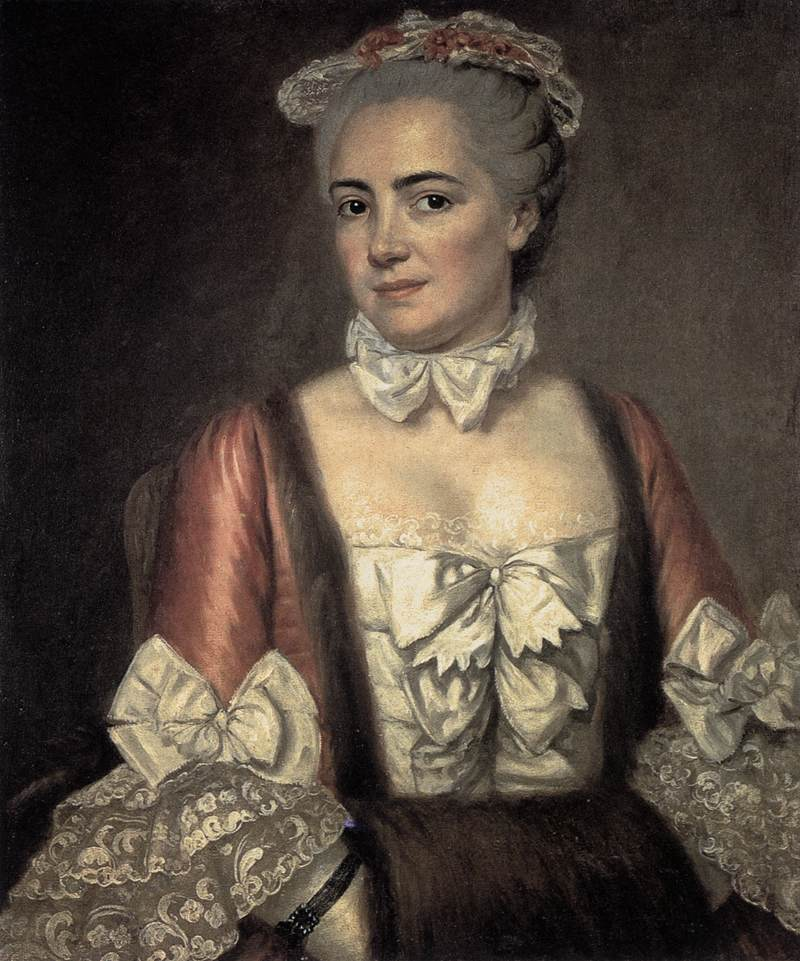
Portrait de Marie-Françoise Buron by Jacques Louis David.

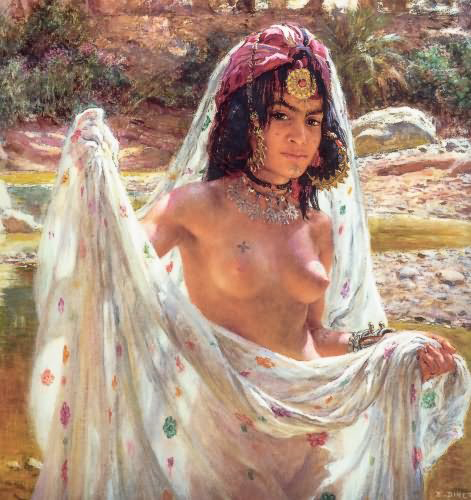
Raoucha, 1901, by Étienne Dinet.

==== Other artists ====
Non-exhaustive list

- Jean Simian (1910-1991), Anvil
- Léon Cauvy (1874-1933)
- Louis Nallard (1918-2016), Mother Algeria
- Marcel Bouqueton (1921-2006)
- Maria Manton (1910-2003)
- René Sintès (1933-1962), Soir et Calme (1960)

=== Contemporary art ===
Non-exhaustive list

- Ahmed Cherkaoui (1934-1967), Sacred Fire
- André Masson (1896-1987), The Parlour
- Abidin Dino (1913-1993), Manifestation for Peace
- Aref Rayess (1928-2005), Salutation to the Martyrs of the Algerian Revolution
- Bettina Heinen-Ayech (1937-2020), The Arch of Thibilis, Dance of the Olive Trees, The Maouna
- Boris Taslitzky (1911-2005),
- Bernard Rancillac (1931-2021),
- Bata Mihailovitch (1923-2011),
- Chafik Abboud (1926-2004),
- Claude Viseux (1927-2008),
- Édouard Pignon (1905-1993),
- Eduardo Arroyo (1937-2018), The Last Colonialist
- Ernest Pignon-Ernest (1942-),
- Erró (1932-),
- Francisco Espinoza Duenas (1926-2020),
- Gérard Gosselin (painter) (1933-),
- Jacques Monory (1924-2018),
- Juanita Guccione (1904-1999),
- Jean-Jacques Lebel (1936-),
- James Pichette (1920-1996),
- Louay Kayali (1934-1978),
- Leonardo Cremonini (1925-2010), Mass opposition in Algiers
- Mamdouh Kashlan (1929-2022), Local aspects
- Maurice Boitel (1919-2007), L'Entrée de la villa Abd-El-Tif IG 2467 - Bateaux du port de la Meule à l'île d'Yeu IG 3758 - Nature morte IG 2454, a painting that has not been reinstated and that disappeared after having been "deposited" with a certain Madame Juillet
- Nasser Assar (1928-2011),
- Pierre Lafoucrière (1927-2017),
- Roberto Matta (1911-2002), Cuba si Argelia también, Untitled
- Siné (1928-2016),
- Wifredo Lam (1902-1982), The Angel

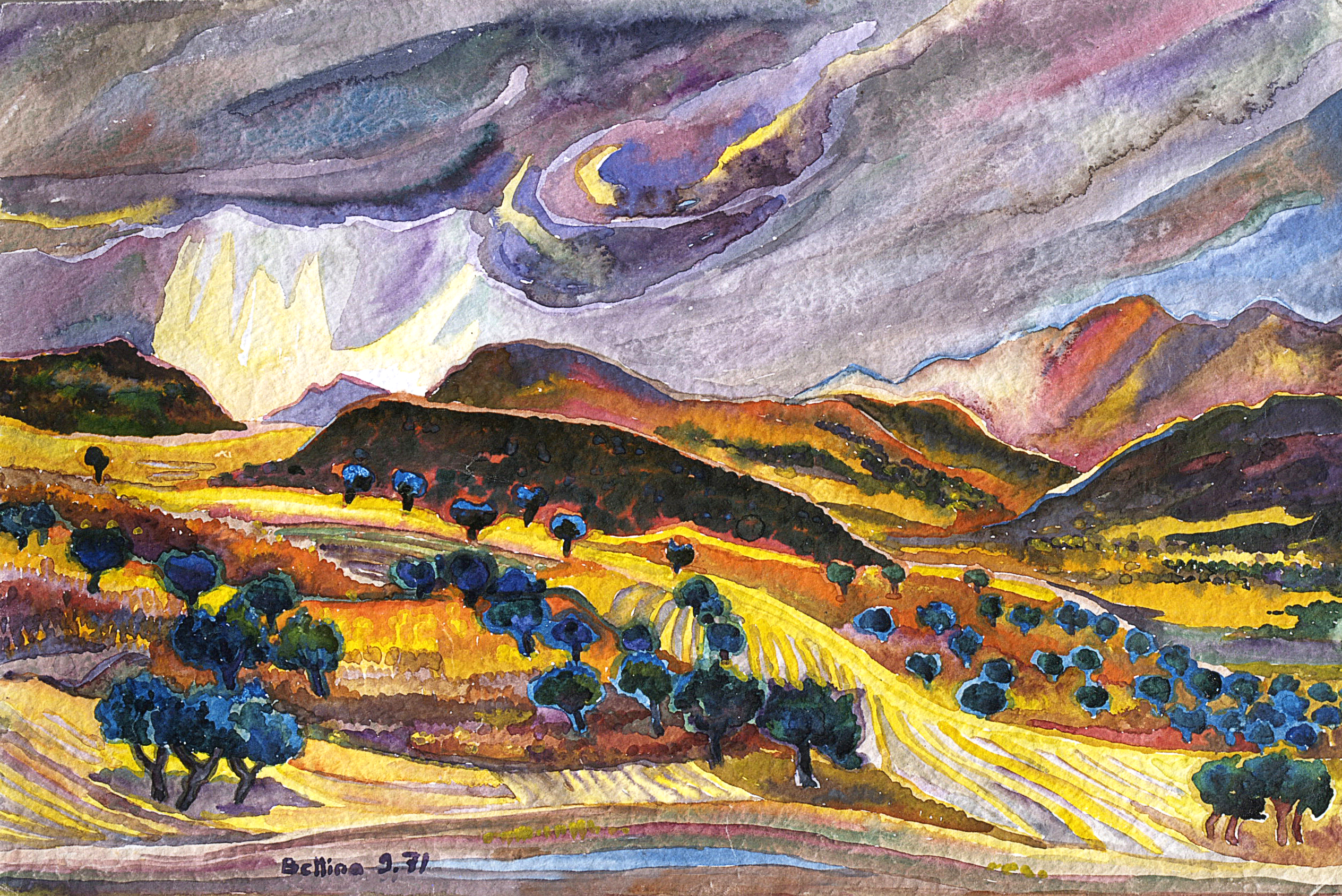
Orage d'été en Algérie, 1974, by Bettina Heinen-Ayech.

=== Algerian art ===
Non-exhaustive list

- Abdelouahab Mokrani (1956-2014), Figures (1982)
- Ali Ali-Khodja (1923-2010), Intérieur de mosquée, Sortie de classe, L'incertitude (1995)
- Aïcha Haddad (1937-2005), Marines de Bejaia, Ghardaia
- Ahmed Kara-Ahmed (1923-2018), Terrasses de la Casbah
- Abdelkader Guermaz (1919-1994), Rythmes abstraits
- Abdallah Benanteur (1931-2017), Souffle Mouillé
- Azouaou Mammeri (1886-1954), Village Kabyle
- Abdelhalim Hemche (1908-1979), Assemblée de femmes et d'enfants
- Baya (1931-1998), Femme au palmier, Femme au bord de la rivière
- Bachir Yellès (1921-2022), Buste de Femme
- Brahim Benamira (-1974), Place du Gouvernement à Alger
- Choukri Mesli (1931-2017), Qaïs et Leïla, Retour des ancêtres
- Denis Martinez (1941-), L'Enfant et l'Arbre vert
- Farès Boukhatem (1941-), Les Réfugiés
- Hacène Benaboura (1898-1960), l'Aqiba, rue de Cambrai(1955), Le quartier de Belcourt(1955), Baie d'Alger(1957), Vue du port d'Alger
- Hocine Ziani (1953-), Paysage de Kabylie (1982), Rue Staoueli (1983), Le Silo bleu (2007)
- Ismail Samsom (1934-1988), Jeune fille au Chien
- Lazhar Hakkar (1945-), Complicité
- Layachi Hamidouche (1947-),
- Leïla Ferhat (1939-2020),
- M'hamed Issiakhem (1928-1985), Les Aveugles, La Mendiante, L'Algérie(1960) (don de l'écrivain français Jacques Arnault)
- Mahieddine Boutaleb (1918-1994), Page de Poème
- Malek Salah (1949-), Les Trois Portes
- Miloud Boukerche (1908-1978), Mon atelier à Montmartre(1950)
- Mohamed Racim (1896-1975), Lendemain de Mariage
- Mohamed Hamimoumna (1897-1975), Enluminure Mauresque
- Mohammed Zmirli (1909-1984), Chemin Laperlier
- Mohamed Temmam (1915-1988), Nature morte à la chandelle (1936), Pont Saint-Louis (1936), Bord de rivière (1938), L'Homme en bleu (1968), Bouquet de fleurs miniature
- Mohamed Ranem (1925-), Double page de Coran
- Mohamed Bouzid (1929-2014), Kabylie, Rue à Alger (1961, 81 × 50 cm), La brebis (1968)
- Mohammed Khadda (1930-1991), Alphabet libre, Maurice Audin, Totem, Le Bivouac, Dahra, J'ai pour totem la paix, Les Casbahs ne s'assiègent pas, Le Volontaire, Sans titre (1), Sans titre (2)
- Mohamed Khetib (1923-),
- Mohamed Louail (1930-2011), Femme au coufin
- Noureddine Chegrane (1942-), Sources de signe
- Rezki Zérarti (1938-), Cuba-Washington
- Souhila Bel Bahar (1934-), "Le Voyage chimérique", "L'Amirauté", "Ketchaoua"
- Salah Hioun (1936-2017 )
- Zoubir Hellal (1952-), L'Aâdjar (1981), l'œil (1982)
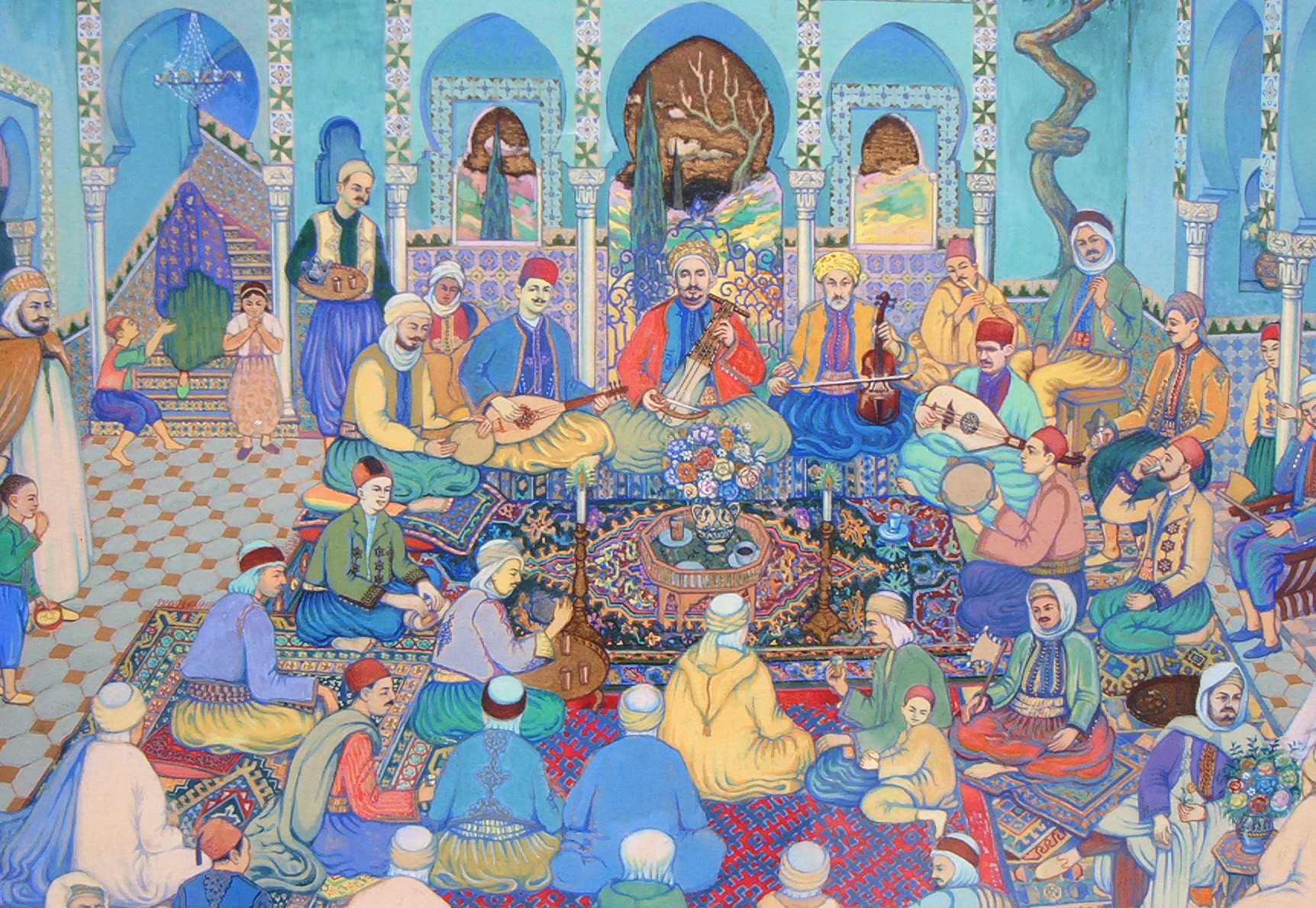
Fête à Tlemcen - Detail of a miniature, by Bachir Yellès.

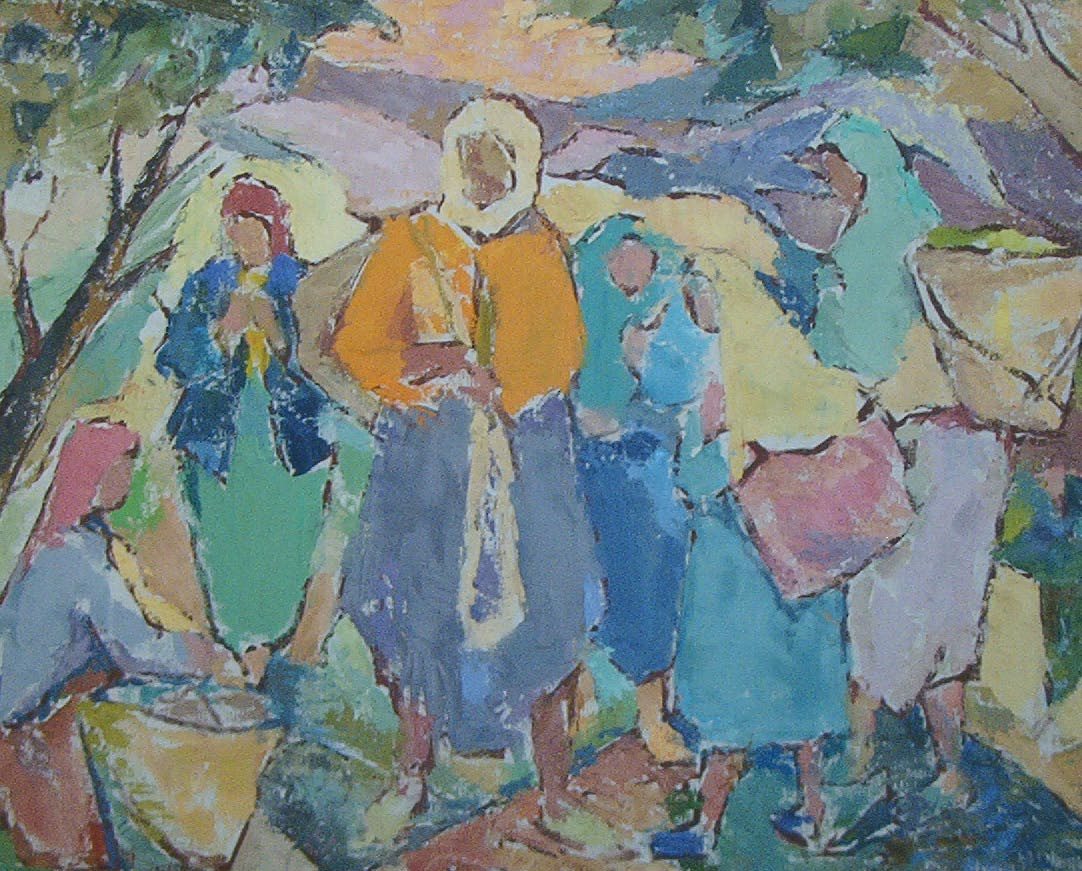
Rencontre - Scène de campagne en Kabylie (2005), by Bachir Yellès.

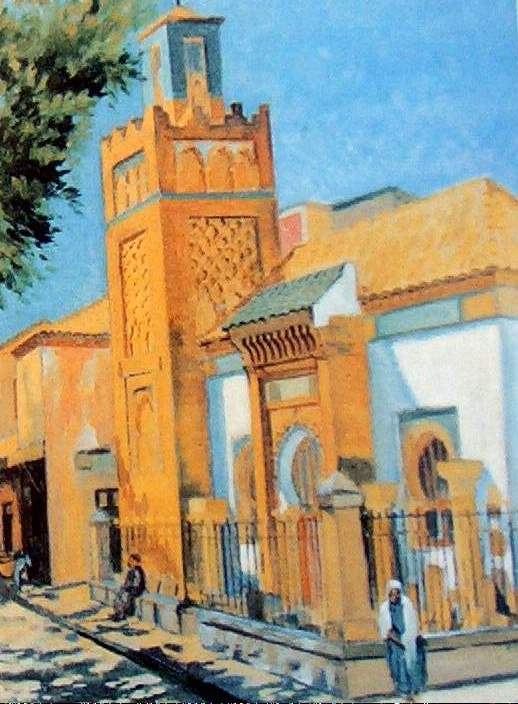
Mosquée de Sidi Bellahsen, by Bachir Yellès.

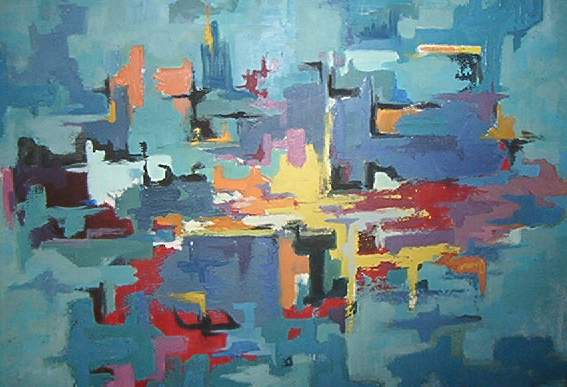
Fulgurance, by Bachir Yellès.

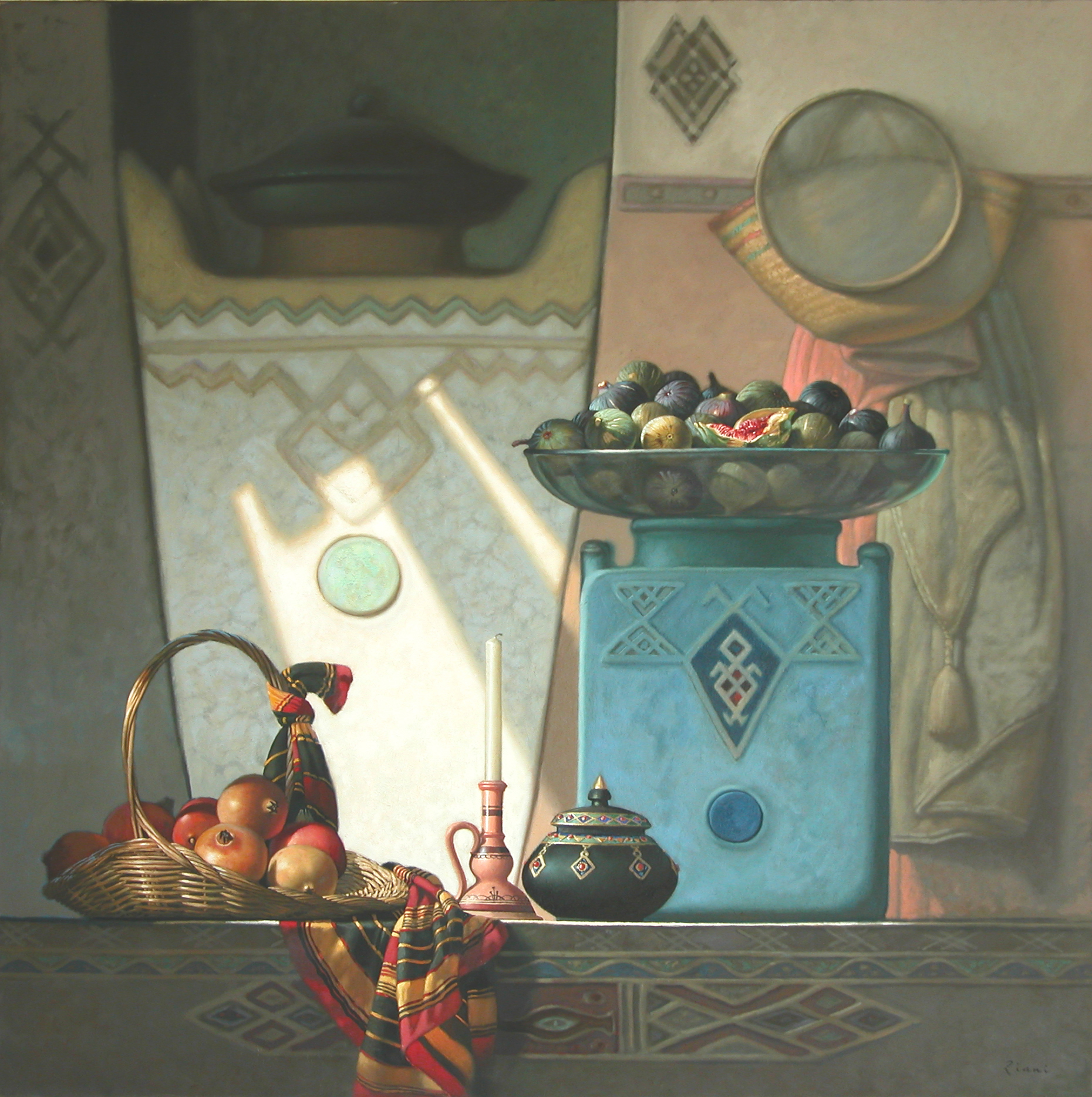
Le Silo bleu, by Hocine Ziani.

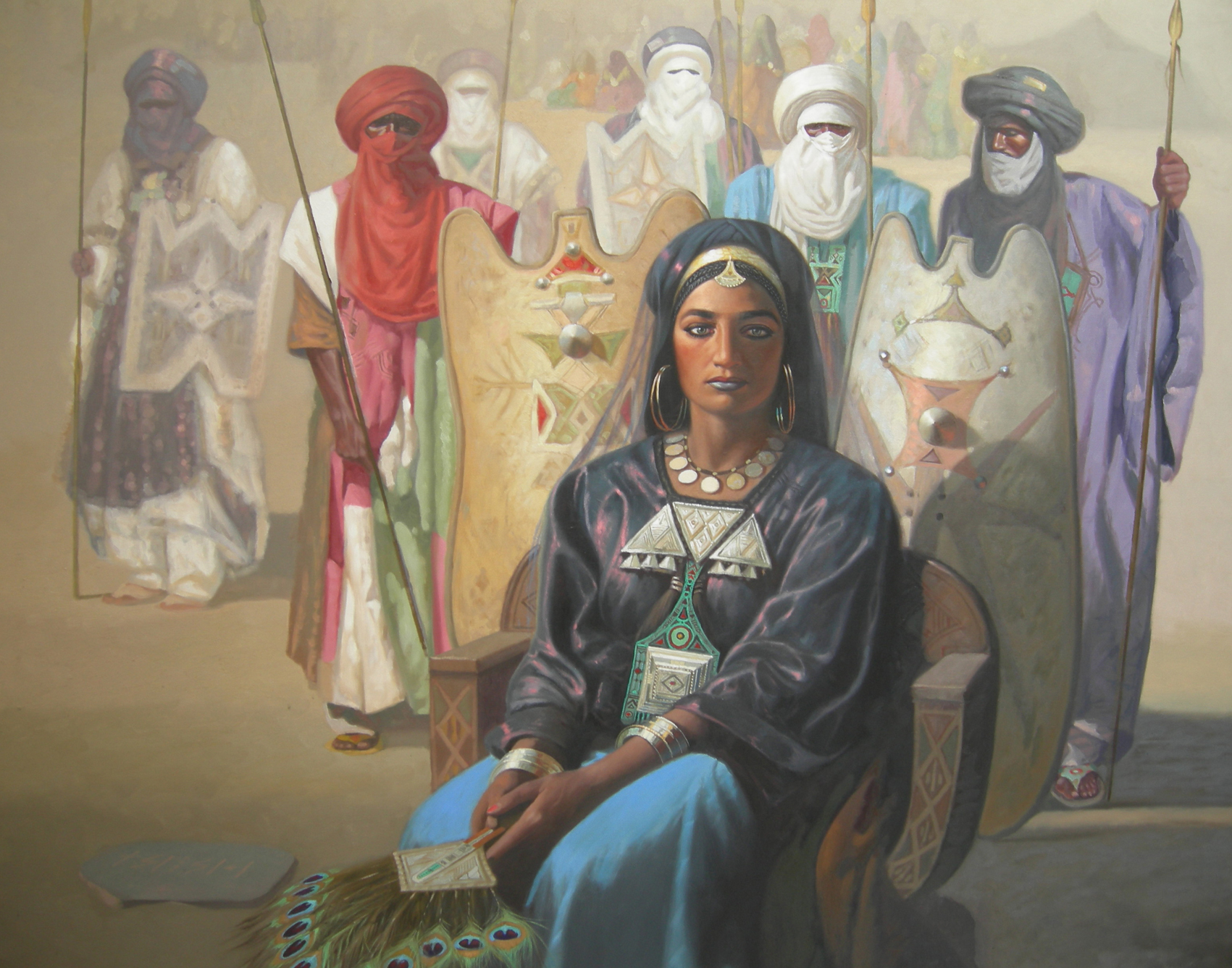
La Reine Tin Hinan, by Hocine Ziani.

== Sculpture collection ==
Some of the 800 sculptures in the museum.

Non-exhaustive list

- Auguste Rodin (1840-1917), 8 bronzes (dont le grand Age d'airain, L'Éternel Printemps) et 6 plâtres (dont la grande Eve, le grand Homme qui marche, Saint-Jean Baptiste),
- Antoine Bourdelle (1861-1929), Dr Koeberlé, Héraklès archer
- André Greck (1912-1993), Portrait de Mr Godin
- Antoine-Louis Barye (1796-1875), La Paix, la Guerre
- Aristide Maillol (1861-1944),
- Camille Alaphilippe (1874-1939), Les Mains, bronze.
- Charles Bigonet (1877-1931), La Mauresque au bain
- Charles Despiau (1874-1946), L'Homme prêt à l'action
- Émile Gaudissard (1872-1956), Femme du Sud algérien nouant son guennour - Kabyle jouant de la flûte
- François Rude (1784-1855), La Tête de la Marseillaise
- George Minne (1866-1941), Buste d'Homme
- Georges Halbout du Tanney (1895-1986), Buste de Jeune Mauresque
- Jean-Baptiste Carpeaux (1827-1875), Rieuse aux Lauriers
- Marcel Damboise (1903-1992), Tête de Mauresque
- Paul Belmondo (1898-1982), Ève
- Paul Jouve (1880-1973),
- Philippe Besnard (1885-1971),

== Prints and Drawings Department ==
The print cabinet contains around 1500 works. The collection includes drawings, etchings, red chalks, watercolours, sketches, lithographs, illuminations, miniatures and calligraphy.

=== Drawings ===
Non-exhaustive list

- Alfred Chataud (1833–1908)
- Eugène Boudin (1824–1898), Les roches noires de Trouville.
- Théodore Chassériau (1819–1856), Portrait présumé de la marquise de Caussade.
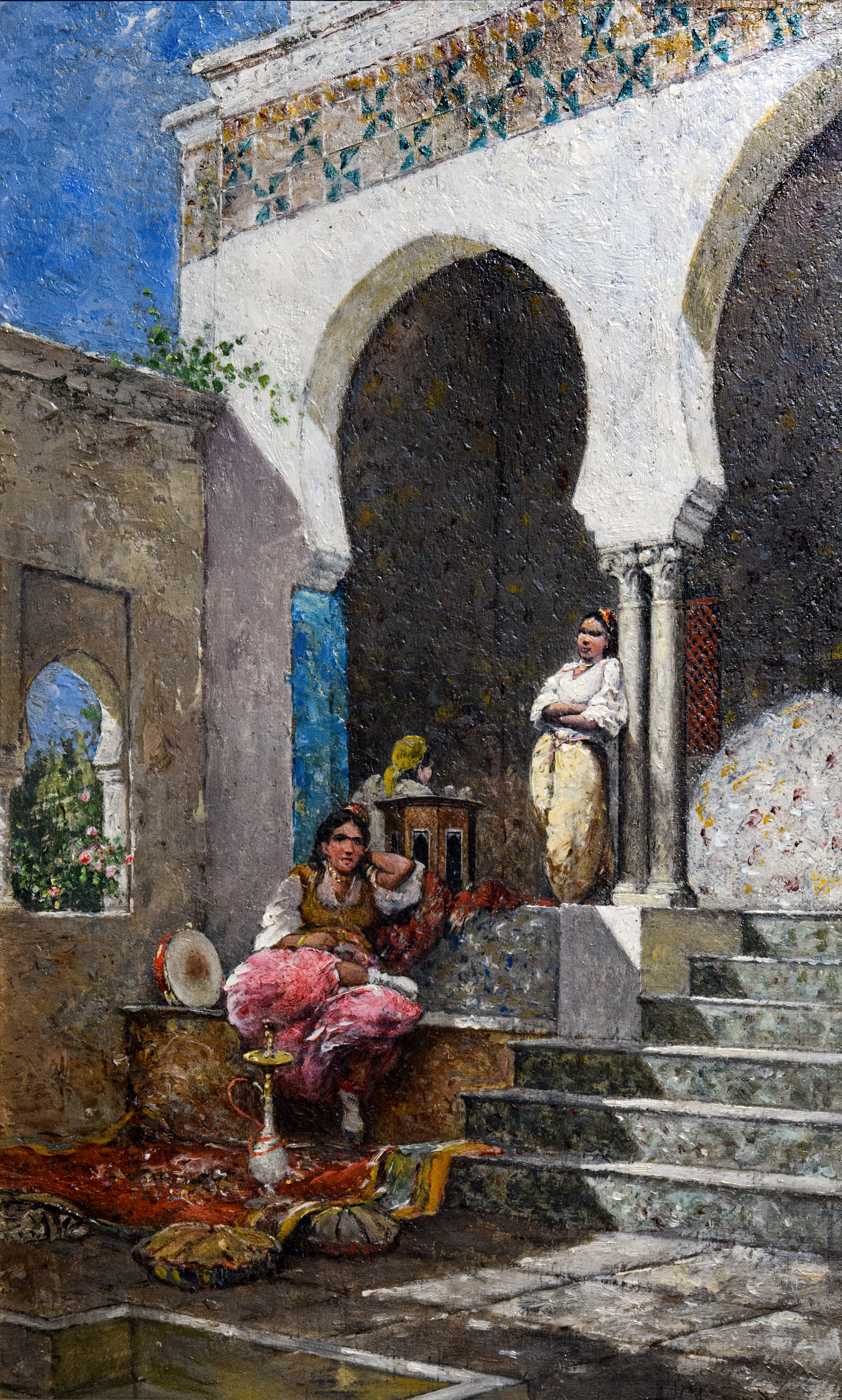
Les Belles du harem - Alfred Chataud.

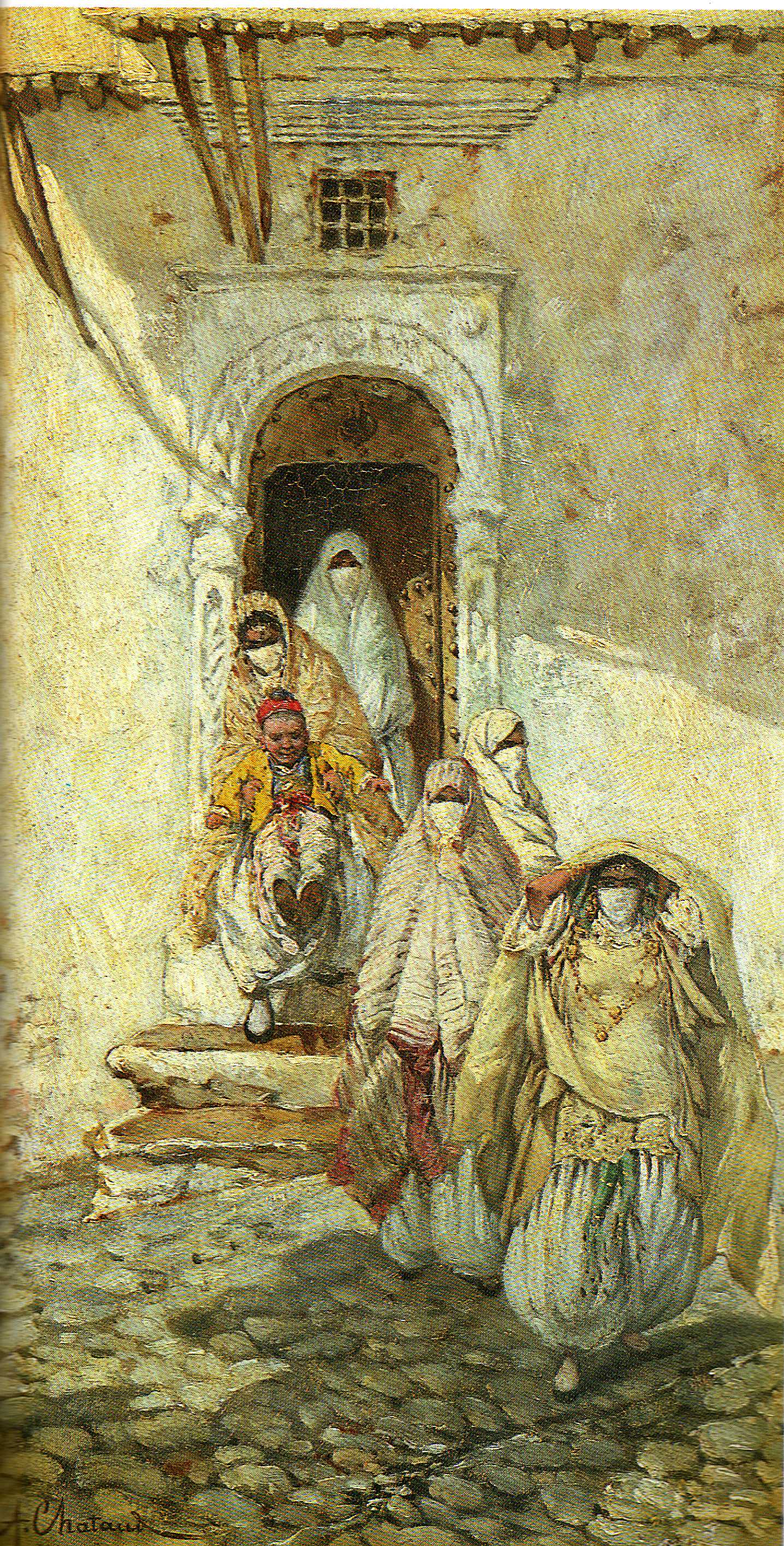
Après la cérémonie de la circoncision - Alfred Chataud.

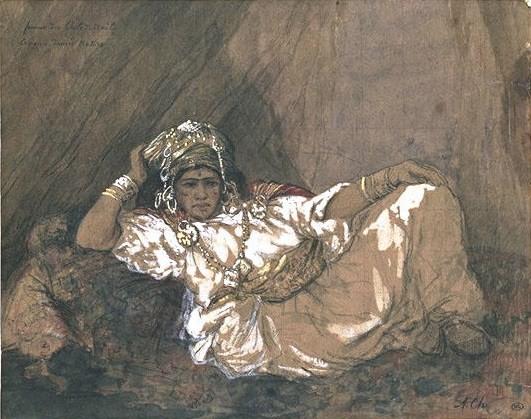
Femme des Ouled-Naïl richement parée - Alfred Chataud.

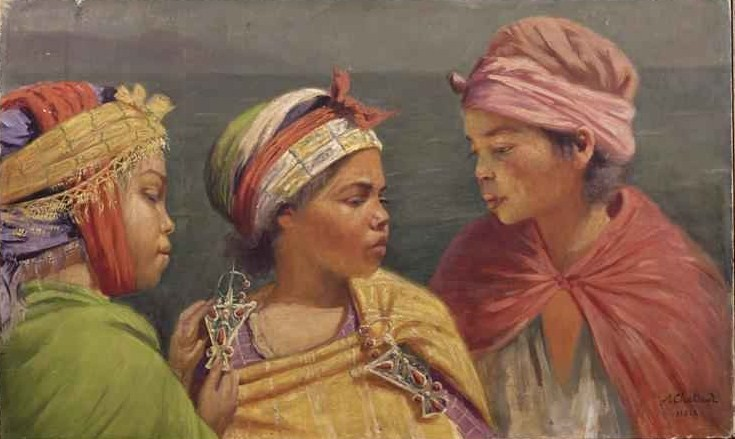
Fillettes d'Alger - Alfred Chataud.

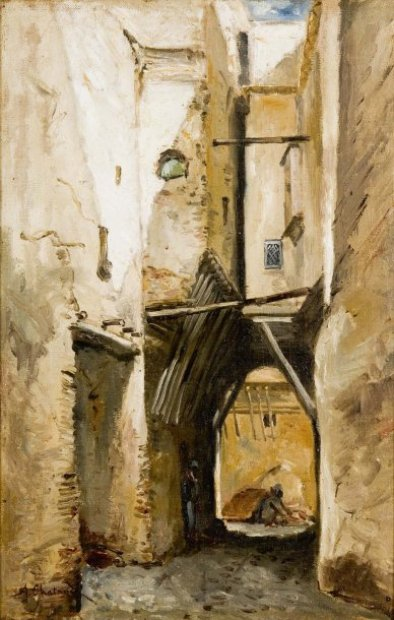
Ruelle de la casbah - Alfred Chataud.

=== Engravings ===
Non-exhaustive list

- Maurice Asselin (1882–1947).

=== Sanguines ===
Non-exhaustive list

- Jean-Baptiste Greuze (1725–1805).

=== Watercolours and Sketches ===
Non-exhaustive list

- Auguste Rodin (1840–1917)
- Aristide Maillol (1861–1944)
- Eugène Delacroix (1798–1863)
- Edme Alexis Alfred Dehodencq (1822–1882)
- Jeanne Poupelet (1874–1932)
- Marcel Gimond (1894–1961)
- Marcel Damboise (1903–1992)
- Paul Belmondo (1898–1982)
- Thomas Couture (1815–1879)

=== Lithographs ===
Non-exhaustive list

- Auguste Raffet (1804–1860)
- Carle Vernet (1758–1836).

=== Illuminations and miniatures ===
Non-exhaustive list

- Mohamed Racim (1896–1975), Histoire de l'Islam
- Mohamed Ranem (1925-)
- Mohamed Hamimoumna (1897–1975)
- Mustapha Ben Debbagh (1906–2006)
- Mahieddine Boutaleb (1918-1994).

=== Calligraphy ===
Non-exhaustive list

- Abdelkader Boumala (1952-)
- Aziz Kacimi (1963-).

=== Other collections ===
- Ceramics
- Decorative arts
- Furniture

== Museum curators ==
- Jean Alazard (from 1930 to 1960)
- Jean de Maisonseul (from 1962 to 1975)
- Bachir Yellès, interim director in 1975
- Malika Dorbani Bouabdellah (1994)
- Dalila Mahammed-Orfali

== See also ==
- List of museums in Algeria
