= Abdelhalim Hemche =

Algerian painter (1908–1979)

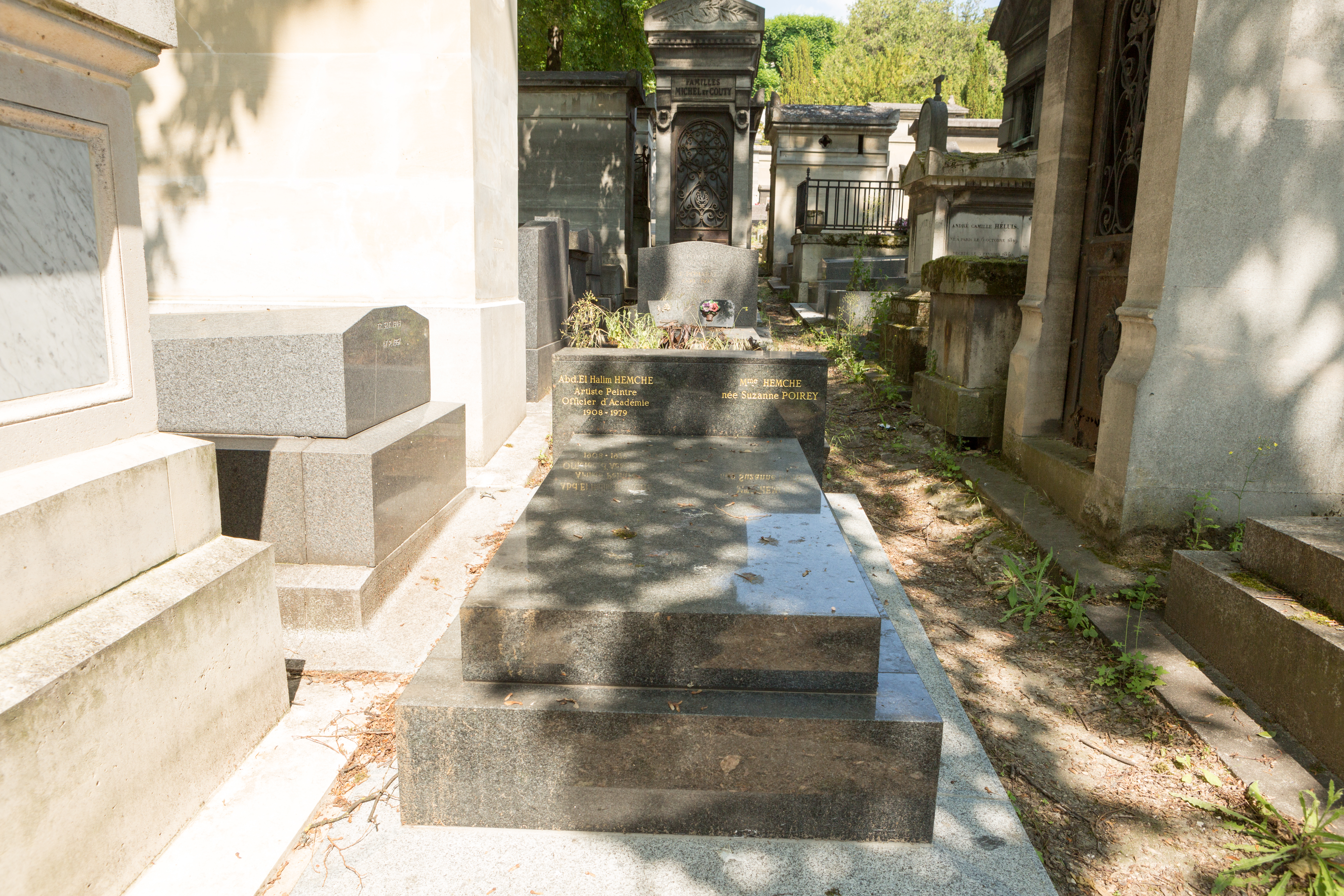
- Abdelhalim Hemche's grave at Père Lachaise Cemetery
- Born: 5 February 1908; Tlemcen, French Algeria
- Died: 1 April 1979 (aged 71); Fontenay-lès-Briis, France
- Education: School of Fine Arts of Algiers, École nationale supérieure des beaux-arts (Paris)
- Known for: Figurative painting
- Notable work: Interior of a Mosque, Tlemcen; * Assembly of Women and Children
- Awards: AOF Award (1949), AEF Award (1955)

Abdelhalim Hemche (5 February 1908 – 1 April 1979) was an Algerian figurative painter.

== Biography ==
Hemche was born on 5 February 1908 in Tlemcen. A student of Cauvy and Antoni at the School of Fine Arts of Algiers, he obtained the Jean Bévia scholarship in 1928 and the City of Algiers scholarship in 1929. He was a drawing teacher in Fez in 1927, inspector of Moroccan arts in 1929, and then inspector general of indigenous arts in Rabat. He participated in the 1937 Paris Exposition by producing illuminations for the Moorish café in the Algeria pavilion. In 1938, he studied in Devambez's studio at the École nationale supérieure des beaux-arts in Paris. After 1962, he taught drawing at the School of Fine Arts in Paris.

Hemche participated in numerous exhibitions in Algiers (1927, 1930) and Paris (1937, 1948), notably at the exhibition of "young Muslim painters and miniaturists of Algeria" organized by Mohammed Racim from 6 to 12 December 1944 at the Franco-Muslim circle of Algeria. In 1949 he received the award from AOF and in 1955 the award from AEF.

Hemche died on 4 April 1979 at Fontenay-lès-Briis at the age of 71. He is buried at the Père Lachaise Cemetery (4th division).

== Notable works ==
- National Museum of Fine Arts of Algiers: Interior of a Mosque, Tlemcen; Assembly of Women and Children.
- National Fund of Contemporary Art: The Mosque; The Entrance of Sidi Boumediene in Tlemcen.

Abdelhalim Hemche's works are also held in museums in Tlemcen, Cleveland, and Brooklyn, US.

== Bibliography ==
- Marion Vidal-Bué, Alger et ses peintres, 1830–1962, Editions Paris Méditerranée, 2000.
- Elisabeth Cazenave, Les artistes de l'Algérie, Bernard Giovanangeli Editions Association Abd-el-Tif, 2001.
- Mansour Abrous, Les artistes algériens : dictionnaire biographique 1917–1999, Casbah editions, Algiers, 2002.
- Djamila Flici-Guendil, Diwan El-Fen, Dictionnaire des peintres, sculpteurs et designers algériens, ENAG/ANEP, Algiers, 2008.
