= Spagnuolo =

Spagnuolo (Italian: [spaɲˈɲwɔːlo], Neapolitan: [ʃpaɲˈɲwoːlə]) is an Italian surname, meaning literally "Spanish or "from Spain" and may refer to:

- Giovanni Spagnuolo, Italian engineer
- Giuseppe Crespi, nicknamed "Lo Spagnuolo", Italian painter
- Jason Spagnuolo, Australian soccer player
- Steve Spagnuolo, Defensive coordinator of Kansas City Chiefs of the National Football League

== See also ==
- Spagnola
- Spagnolo
