= Spagnola =

Spagnola is an Italian surname, meaning literally "Spanish", from and/or of "Spain" and may refer to:

== Music and film ==
- "La spagnola", an art song by Vincenzo di Chiara (1860–1937)
- La Spagnola (film), an Australian film

== People ==
- Ali Spagnola, American musician and comedian
- John Spagnola (born 1957), American football player

== See also ==
- Spagnoli
- Spagnolo
