= Aïcha Haddad =

Aïcha Haddad (Arabic: عائشة حداد; 1937 – February 24, 2005) was an Algerian visual artist. Known by the nickname Moudjahida, she combined Algerian miniaturist tradition with Western art movements like cubism, symbolism, and nouveau réalisme.

== Early life ==
Aïcha Haddad was born in 1937 in Bordj Bou Arréridj, Algeria. Her life and work were marked by the history of her family, who hailed from the Hachem tribe in Medjana. She was deeply tied to Algeria's Hautes Plaines, where she would spend her childhood and adolescence.

== Algerian War ==
In 1954, while studying to be a nurse in Sétif, the 17-year-old Haddad became one of the first women to join the ranks of the Algerian National Liberation Army. In 1956, after finishing her studies, she joined the Combattants de la Libération guerrilla group and participated in the Soummam conference, where the Algerian state was founded. During this time, Haddad was arrested by the French colonial army and imprisoned for more than four years. Her experience during the Algerian War earned her the nickname Moudjahida.

== Artistic career ==
After being freed from prison at the country's independence in 1962, she moved to Algiers and began studying art with the painter Camille Leroy at the Society of Fine Arts of Algiers. From 1966 to 1988, she taught visual arts at Algiers' Lycée Omar-Racim. She also worked as an inspector for the Ministry of National Education from 1983 to 1988.

In 1972, she displayed her first work in a group exhibition at the former Galerie des Quatre-Colonnes in Algiers. She won a prize at the city's Concours de la Ville, which brought her wider recognition. She became increasingly engaged in the Algerian art world, joining the National Union of Plastic Artists (UNAP) in 1973 and the General Union of Arab Painters (UGPA) in 1975. She formed a long friendship with the painters Baya and Souhila Belbahar.

Haddad worked in the tradition of Algerian miniatures, or small painted illustrations, influenced by the likes of Mohammed Racim. Her work is marked by the colors of her youth in the Hautes Plaines. Over the course of her career, while traveling and visiting museums, galleries, and international art fairs, she was exposed to new art forms and influenced by the likes of Antoni Gaudí, Jean Tinguely, Niki de Saint Phalle, César Baldaccini, Arman, and I.M. Pei. In the 1990s, inspired by the nouveau réalistes, she began working in sculpture and collage using manufactured objects.

From the 1970s to early 2000s, Haddad's work appeared in various solo and group exhibitions both in Algeria and abroad. Her pieces are held in the collections of the National Museum of Fine Arts of Algiers, the Bardo National Museum, the Food and Agriculture Organization, UNESCO, and the Japan Foundation, among others.

== Death and legacy ==
Haddad died in 2005, in Algiers, after a long illness.

Since 2003, a prize for female painters given by the City of Algiers has been named in her honor. A room at the National Museum of Fine Arts of Algiers also bears her name.
