= Louis Ferdinand =

Louis Ferdinand may refer to:

- Louis, Dauphin of France (born 1729) (1729–1765), son of King Louis XV, father of Kings Louis XVI, Louis XVIII, and Charles X of France
- Prince Louis Ferdinand of Prussia (1772–1806), post-Frederican soldier, son of Prince Augustus Ferdinand of Prussia, nephew of Frederick the Great
- Prince Ludwig Ferdinand of Bavaria (1859–1949), member of the Bavarian house of Wittelsbach and an Infante of Spain
- Louis Ferdinand Antoni (1872–1940), French Orientalist painter and sculptor
- Louis-Ferdinand Céline (1894–1961), French novelist, polemicist, and physician
- Louis Ferdinand, Prince of Prussia (1907–1994), son of Crown Prince Wilhelm of Germany, head of the Prussian Royal House
