= Leonardo Cremonini =

Italian visual artist (1925-2010)

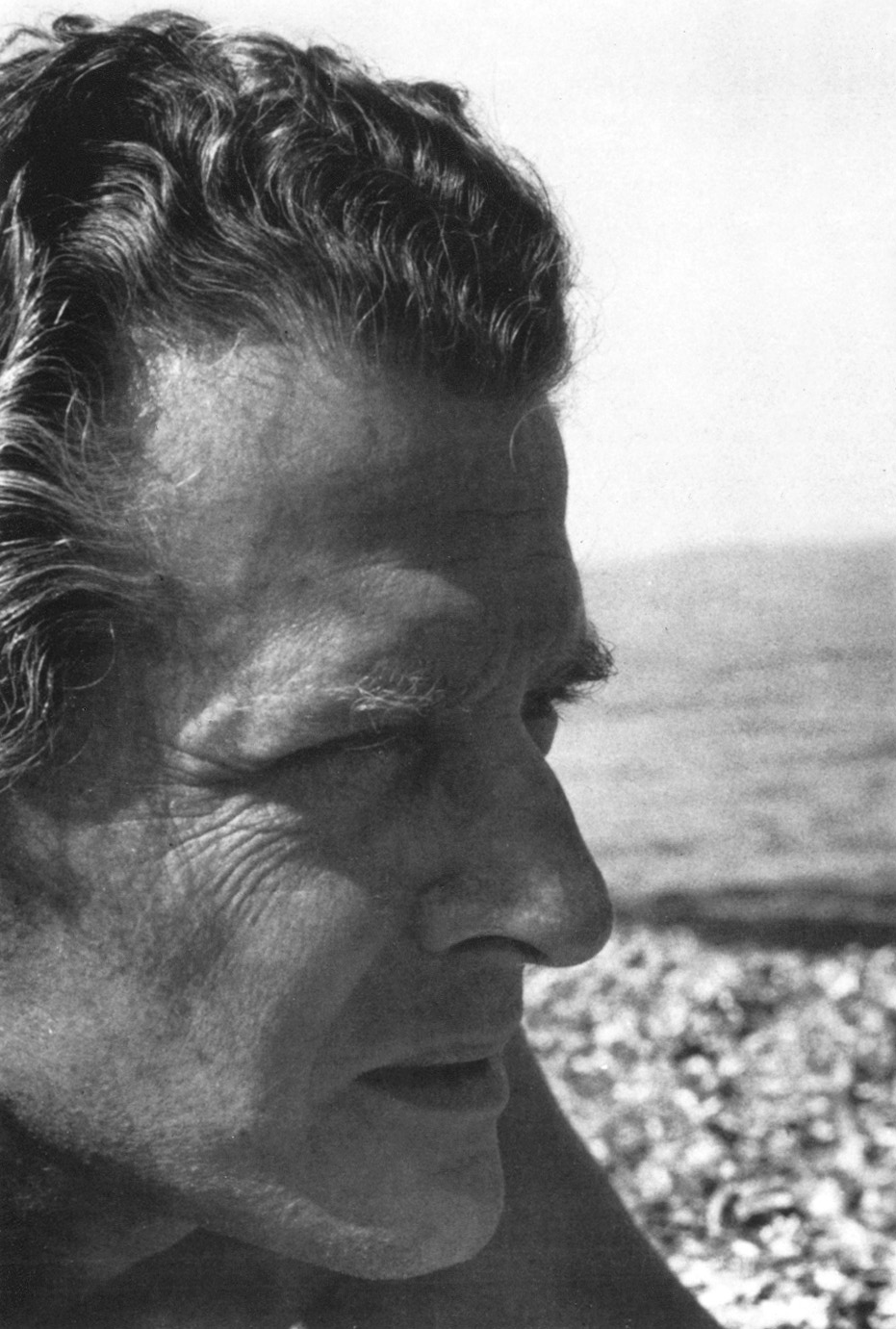
- Leonardo Cremonini
- Born: 26 November 1925; Bologna, Italy
- Died: 12 April 2010 (aged 84); Paris, France
- Education: Brera Academy
- Known for: Painting
- Movement: Narrative Figuration

Leonardo Cremonini (1925-2010) was an Italian visual artist.

== Life ==
Leonardo Cremonini was the son of a railway worker who taught him the basics of painting. In 1935, his father had to relocate to Calabria for professional reasons. The Tyrrhenian coast where Cremonini would grow up would have a profound impact on his later work. Supported by a grant from the Collegio Venturoli he studied from 1932 to 1936 at the Academy of Fine Arts in Bologna, and then at the Brera Academy in Milan. In 1948 he had his first exhibition in Verona. In Bologna he met Giorgio Morandi. Through him he received another scholarship, which in 1951 enabled him to stay in Paris. His first clients he found in the USA; due to an exhibition in the gallery of Catherine Viviano in 1952. This gallery hosted three more exhibitions of his work during the next ten years.

In 1960 an exhibition of his works at the Parisian 'Galerie du Dragon' brought him to the attention of the French public. During the 1960s he joined the ranks of the Figuration Narrative movement in French art. His art was well received and gained critical appreciation by a number of known French and Italian writers and literary figures such as Louis Althusser, Michel Butor, Italo Calvino, Régis Debray and Marc Le Bot. The latter gave him a book and an entire lecture schedule in his course about the history of contemporary art at the University of Paris I. Cemonini exhibited the Venice Biennale in 1964.

In 1974, he married fellow painter Roberta Crocioni. They had a son named Pietro.

From 1983 to 1992 Cremonini served as director of the studio at the École des beaux-arts in Paris. The then Minister of Culture Jack Lang acknowledged his intention for the university to become more open to contemporary art. Paradoxically, Cremonini shut himself off artistically to current trends. The wild, so-called free art of the next generation, represented by artists such as Jean-Michel Basquiat, he did not feel at all. "Painting must not make a noise," he wrote in 1980, "because only the doubt is dynamic."

== Legacy ==
As abstraction and conceptual art gained prominence in the 20th century, Cremonini seemed to be marginalized. But a recent resurgence in figurative art suggest a newfound appreciation for the artist. Among his admirers was fellow artist Francis Bacon (artist), who suggested that his friend poet W.H. Auden write about him. William Rubin, the former director of the MoMA, praised Cremonini by saying that his work embodies a spirit of timeless monumentality. He has been awarded the Commandeur des Arts et des Lettres in France, member of the Royal Academy of Belgium, member of the San Luca National Academy in Rome and of the “Accademia delle Arti e del Disegno” in Florence. He has also been awarded the Marzotto International Prize in 1969 and the Prize from the Italian President of the Republic in 1979.

== Museums ==
- Algiers, National Museum of Fine Arts
- Detroit, Institute of Arts
- Florence, Uffizi Gallery
- Grenoble, musée de Grenoble
- Jerusalem, Israel Museum
- Lille, musée d’art moderne
- Marseille, musée Cantini
- Milan, Galleria d'Arte Moderna
- New York, Brooklyn Museum
- New York, William Louis-Dreyfus Foundation
- New York, Museum of Modern Art
- New York, Rockefeller Center
- Paris, Fonds national d'art contemporain
- Paris, musée d'art moderne de la Ville de Paris
- Paris, musée national d'art moderne
- Paris, musée de l'histoire de l'immigration
- Pittsburgh, The Carnegie Museum
- Princeton, Princeton University Art Museum
- Strasbourg, musée d’art moderne et contemporain
- Washington, Hirshhorn Museum
