= Souhila Belbahar =

Algerian painter (1934–2023)

- سهيلة بلبحار
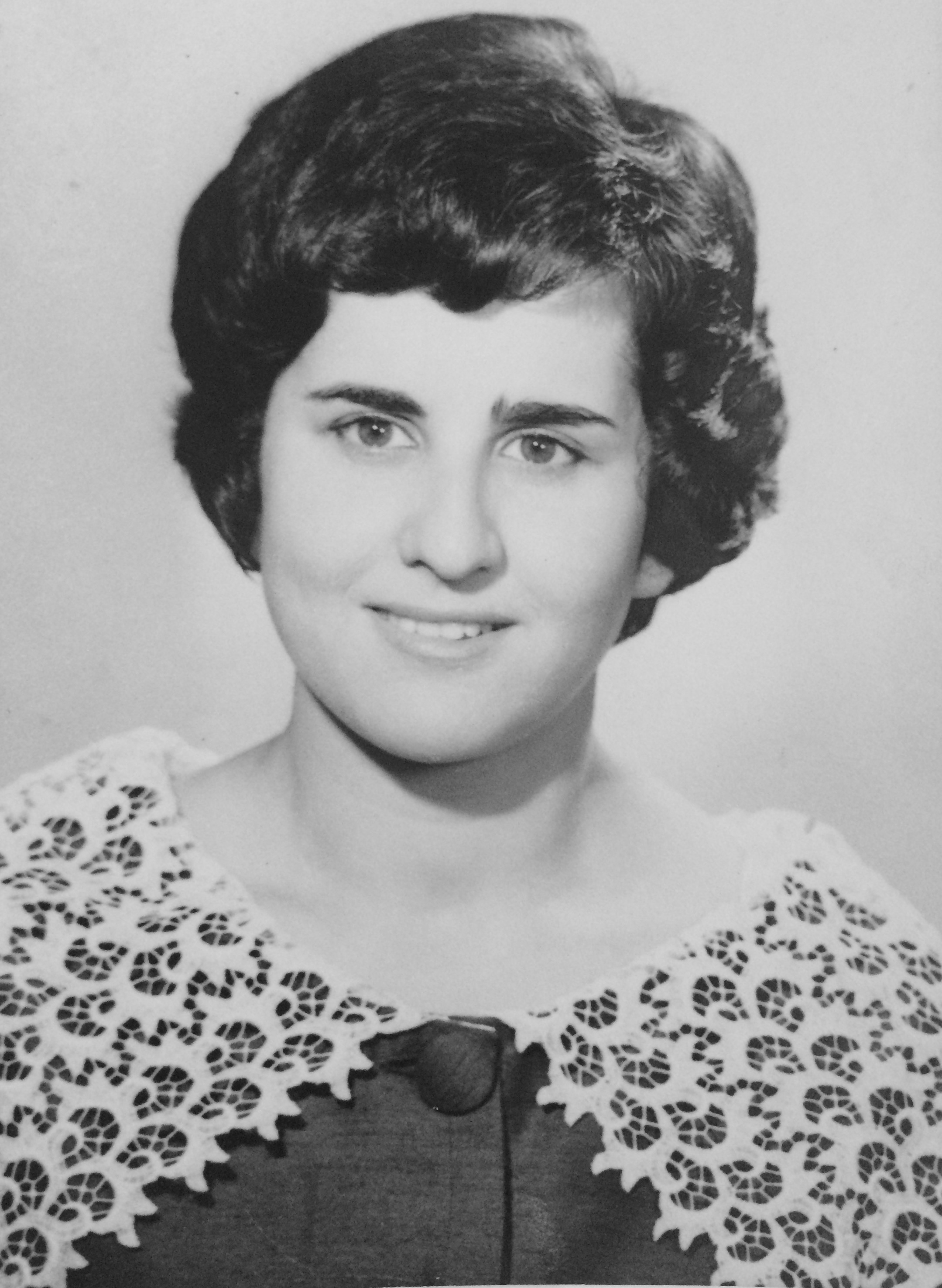
- Born: 17 February 1934; Blida, French Algeria
- Died: 23 March 2023 (aged 89)

Souhila Belbahar (alternatively Souhila Bel Bahar; 17 February 1934 – 23 March 2023) was an Algerian painter. In 2018, she was awarded Algeria's National Order of Merit.

== Biography ==
Belbahar was born in Blida, Algeria, in 1934. A self-taught artist, she held her first exhibition in 1971, at the age of 37. Since that time, she has participated in numerous solo and group exhibitions in Algiers. The Algerian Cultural Centre in Paris hosted a solo exhibition of Belbahar's works in 1986.

Belbahar exhibited at the National Museum of Fine Arts of Algiers in 1984. The museum held a retrospective exhibition of her works in 2008. In 2016, the museum published Il pleut des jasmins sur Alger, a biography of Belbahar written by her daughter, Dalila Hafiz.

In 2018, Belbahar was awarded the National Order of Merit by the Algerian Minister of Culture, Azzedine Mihoubi.

Belbahar died on 23 March 2023, at the age of 89.
