= Spagnolo =

Spagnolo is an Italian surname, literally meaning "Spanish" or "from Spain" and may refer to:

- Anthony Spagnolo, Australian politician
- Duilio Spagnolo (circa 1927–2005), Italian boxer
- Kathleen Mary Spagnolo (1919–2016), American artist
- Renata Spagnolo (born 1989), Italian swimmer

== See also ==
- Forte Spagnolo
- Spagnola
- Spagnoli
- Spagnuolo
- Spagnoletto
