= Louis Ferdinand Antoni =

French painter (1872–1940)

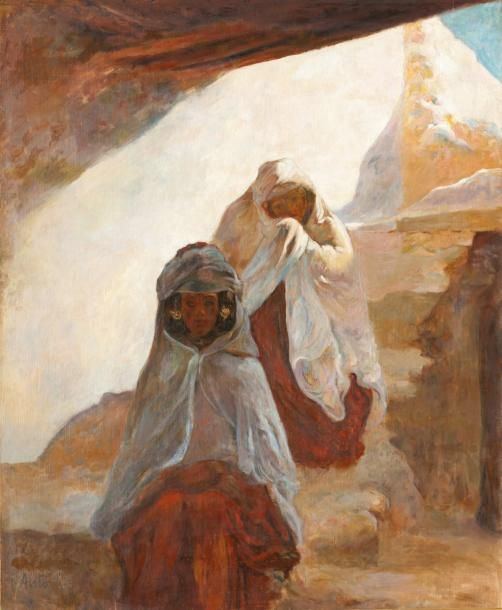
Berber Women

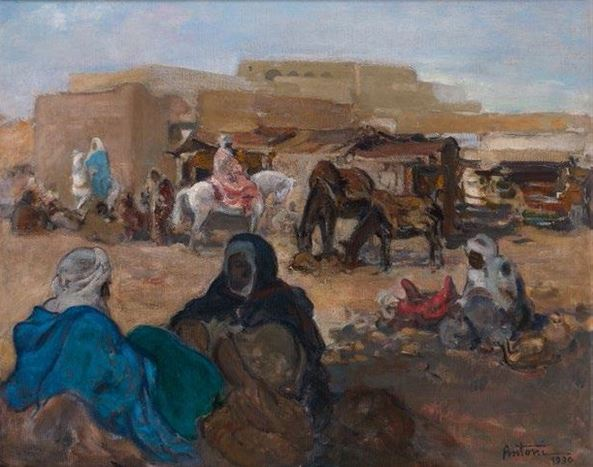
The Market in Biskra

Louis Ferdinand Antoni (15 November 1872, Bastia – 14 December 1940, Algiers) was a French Orientalist painter and sculptor.

== Biography ==
Not long after his birth, his family moved from Corsica to Algeria. There, he studied at the Collège St-Charles in Blida, then at the Lycée in Algiers. He was there only a short time before transferring to the Ecole des Beaux-Arts d'Alger, where he studied with Hippolyte Dubois. In 1892, he obtained a scholarship that enabled him to study in Paris; at the École nationale supérieure des beaux-arts, and in the studios of Léon Bonnat. His primary artistic influences were Eugène Delacroix and the Impressionists.

After leaving Paris, he returned to Algeria, where he exhibited in the local salons, but also participated in showings at the Salon des Artistes Français. In 1906, he married the artist, Marie Gautier (c.1870–?), who introduced him to the art of color engraving. This soon became his primary enthusiasm, producing numerous etchings that were published in France. After this, he exhibited exclusively with the Société nationale des beaux-arts.

In 1909, he was awarded a grant to travel throughout French West Africa; visiting Guinea, Côte d'Ivoire, Benin, Senegal and Timbuktu, in the French Sudan. It was a very busy, fruitful period that produced numerous etchings and canvases. Following this trip, he returned to Paris to study fresco painting.

In 1912, he was appointed Professor of Decorative Arts at his alma mater, the École des beaux-arts, and held that position until his death. Two years later, he enlisted as a soldier and was wounded in battle, for which he was decorated with the Legion of Honor. After the death of Léon Cauvy, in 1933, he became the École's Director.

His works may be seen at the Musée National des Beaux-Arts d'Alger, Ahmed Zabana National Museum, and the Musée du Luxembourg.

== Sources ==
- Marion Vidal-Bué, Alger et ses peintres 1830-1962, éditions Paris Méditerranée, 2000 ISBN 978-2-8427-2095-7
- Elisabeth Cazenave, Les artistes de l'Algérie, Bernard Giovanangeli, éditions Association Abd-el-Tif, 2001 ISBN 978-2-916929-27-9
- Biography by Robert Randau @ the Cercle Algérianiste
