= Alfred Chataud =

French painter (1833–1908)

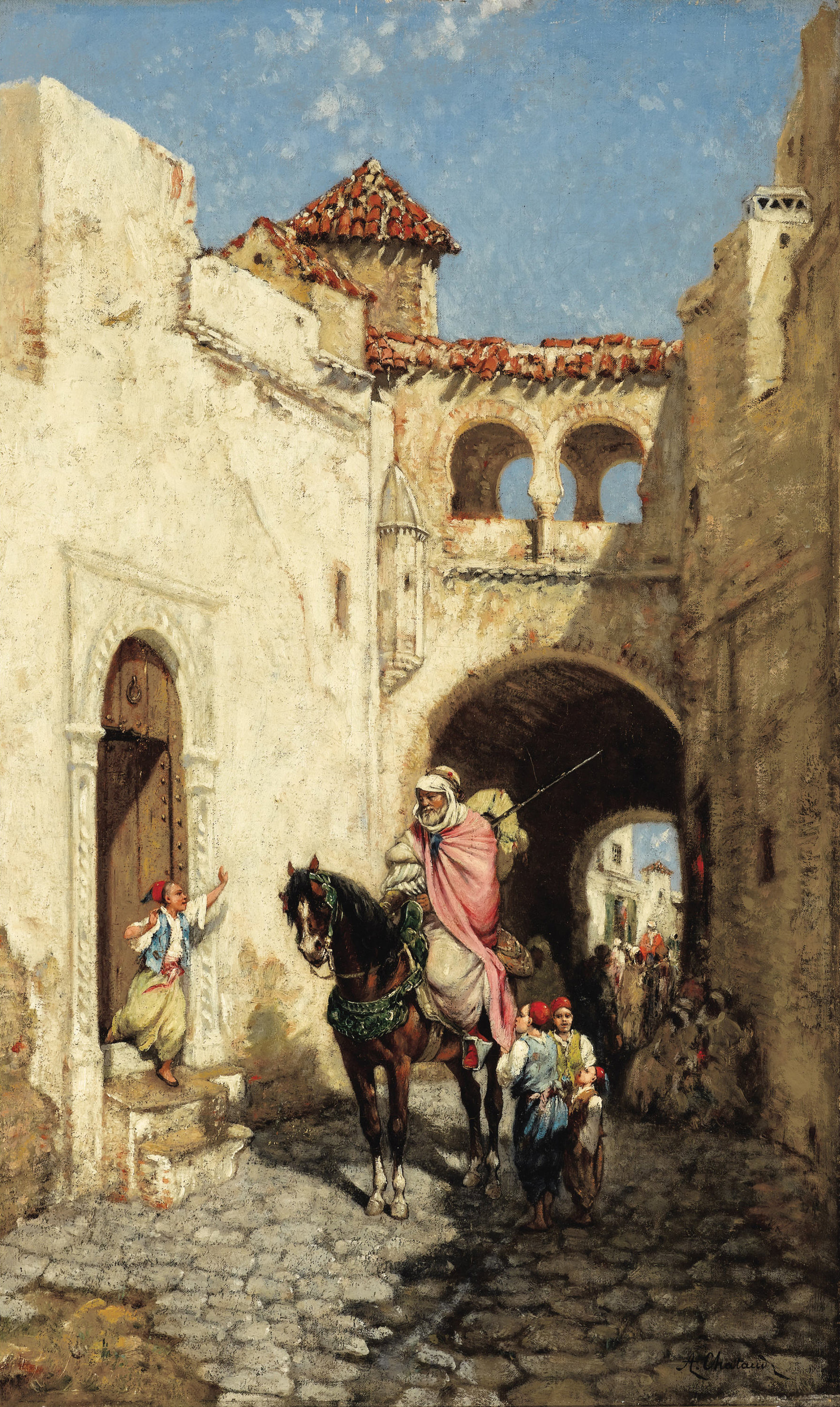
Street Scene

Marc Alfred Chataud (17 August 1833, Marseille – 11 May 1908, Algiers) was a French Orientalist painter.

== Life and work ==
He was the son of a banker and initially studied law. For several years, he was employed by an insurance company in Paris. Eventually, he decided to became an artist and was a student of Émile Loubon at his drawing school in Marseille, from 1857 to 1860. He completed his studies back in Paris, in the studios of Charles Gleyre.

His family owned real estate in Algeria, so he visited there several times, beginning in 1856. He finally settled near Sidi Moussa in Algiers Province in 1892.

In the Salons of 1864 and 1865, he exhibited his first Orientalist paintings. At first, he was influenced by the melodramatic works of Henri Regnault. Later, he adopted a realistic style; painting scenes from daily life.

In 1897, he was one of the founders of the "Société des Artistes Algeriens", and became its deputy chairman in 1904. Together with Hippolyte Lazerges and Joseph Sintès, he helped establish the "Algerian School" of painting.

== Sources ==
- André Alauzen, Dictionnaire des peintres et sculpteurs de Provence Alpes Côte d'Azur, Éditions Jeanne Laffitte, 1986, Marseille, ISBN 2-86276-131-1
- Lynne Thornton, Les Orientalistes, peintres voyageurs, ACR Éditions Poche Couleur, 1994, Courbevoie, ISBN 2-86770-060-4
- Dominique Lobstein: "Chataud, Marc Alfred". In: Allgemeines Künstlerlexikon, Vol.18, Saur, 1997, ISBN 3-598-22758-2, pg.311
