= Giovanni Spagnuolo =

Italian academic (born 1967)

Giovanni Spagnuolo (born 12 September 1967 in Salerno, Italy) is an Italian engineer. Since May 2016 he is Full Professor of Electrical Engineering at DIEM department of the University of Salerno, Italy.

He received the M.Sc. degree in Electronic Engineering from the University of Salerno (Italy) on April 5, 1993, and the Ph.D. degree in Electrical Engineering from the University "Federico II" of Naples in 1998.

He was named Fellow of the Institute of Electrical and Electronics Engineers (IEEE) in 2016 for contributions to control of photovoltaic systems.

Included in the list of Most Influential Minds published by Thomson Reuters.

Since January 2011 he has been serving as member of the steering committee and editor for the topic “PV system control”, of the IEEE Journal of Photovoltaics.

From January 2007 to July 2019, he served as associate editor of the IEEE Transactions on Industrial Electronics.

From October 2012 to October 2014, he was chairman of the "Technical Committee on Renewable Energy Systems" of the IEEE Industrial Electronics Society.

Since 2017 he has been a member of the IEEE European Public Policy Initiative Working Group on Energy.

For the DIEM department, he is coordinator of the research activities of three FP7/H2020 projects in the field of photovoltaic systems and fuel cells (H2020-GV2-2014 OPTEMUS, H2020-JTI-FCH-2014-1 HEALTH-CODE, FP7 D-CODE) and of some research contracts signed by National Semiconductors Corporation in Santa Clara (USA) and Bitron Industrie S.p.A. in Grugliasco (Turin-Italy).

He is co-author of five international patents, two of them owned by industries.

He has been a member of the organizing committee, of the steering committee and track chair of many IEEE (ISIE, IECON, ICIT, EPE-PEMC, POWERENG, ICCEP) conferences.
