= Baya (artist) =

Algerian artist (1931–1998)

Baya Mahieddine
- Baya in 1989
- Born: Fatima Haddad; 12 December 1931; Fort de l'Eau, French Algeria
- Died: 9 November 1998 (aged 66); Blida, Algeria
- Known for: Painting; ceramics
- Movement: Surrealism; naïve art
- Spouse: Mahfoud Mahieddine (m. 1953)
- Children: 6

Signature
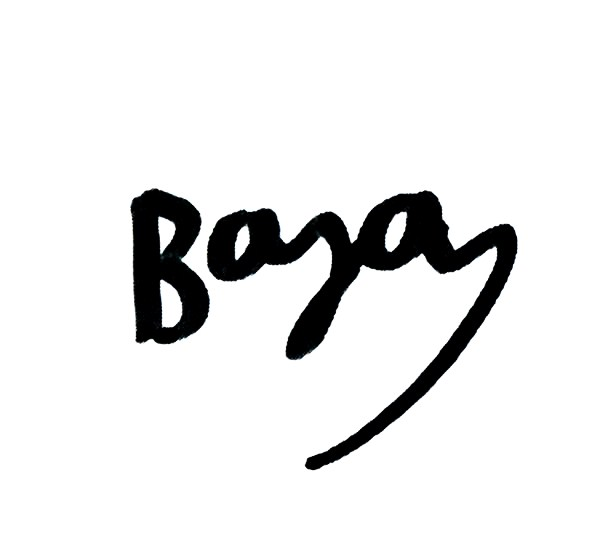

Baya Mahieddine (Arabic: باية محي الدين; born Fatima Haddad [فاطمة حداد]; 12 December 1931 – 9 November 1998) was an Algerian painter and, to a lesser extent, ceramist. While she did not identify her work as belonging to a particular art genre, critics have classified her paintings as surrealist, primitive, naïve, and modern. She was an entirely self-taught artist.

At the age of sixteen Baya had her first exhibition, in Paris, where she gained notice from artists such as Pablo Picasso and André Breton. Her work was presented in various exhibitions in France and Algeria, and has appeared on Algerian postage stamps.

== Life and career ==
Born in 1931 in Fort de l'Eau (today's Bordj El Kiffan), Baya was orphaned by the age of five. When she was eleven, Marguerite Caminat, a French artist and collector residing in Algiers, stepped in as her protector, although the relationship is subject to dispute, with some sources stating that Baya was responsible for completing household duties for Caminat, much like a servant. Caminat furnished her with a residence, art supplies, and words of support for her art.

In 1947, Caminat, who was well connected in the literary and art worlds, was visited by a French art dealer, Aimé Maeght, who, later that year, presented Baya's work in a solo exhibition in his gallery. André Breton wrote the preface to the catalogue of that exhibition. After her time in Paris, Baya lived in Vallauris, where she worked on pottery and met Picasso, who was highly impressed by her work.

Baya returned to Algeria, and in 1953 she married Mahfoud Mahieddine, a famous musician, in an arranged marriage. She did not paint from 1953 to 1963, which coincides with the Algerian War. During these years she gave birth to six children.

In 1963 she resumed painting, exhibiting both new and old work in Algiers and in Paris. Some of her early works were collected by the Algiers Museum of Fine Arts and the staff there encouraged her to take up her painting career again. In 1969, one of Baya's work depiciting a mother and child was used on an Algerian postage stamp.

She continued to work until her death in Blida, Algeria on 9 November 1998.

== Reviews ==
Breton's enthusiastic reception of and encomium to Baya and her work is expressed in his 1947 essay "Baya":

Baya's gouaches often place female figures alongside birds, fish and flowers, arranging the forms in repeating patterns that recall Arabic lettering and Islamic art. In 2018, New York University's Grey Art Gallery presented Baya: Woman of Algiers, the first North American solo exhibition devoted to her work. The exhibition brought together about twenty gouaches originally shown around the time of her 1947 Paris debut.

"I speak not as others have, to deplore an ending, but rather to promote a beginning, and at this beginning, Baya is queen. The beginning of an age of emancipation and of agreement, in radical rupture with the preceding era, one of whose principal levers for man might be the systematic, always increasing impregnation of nature. The beginnings of this age lie with Charles Fourier, the new impetus has just been furnished by Malcolm of Chazal. But for the rocket that launches the new age, I propose the name Baya. Baya, whose mission is to reinvigorate the meaning of those beautiful nostalgic words: happy Arabia. Baya holds and rekindles the golden bough."

== Tribute ==
In 2018, a Google Doodle was created to celebrate her 87th birthday.
