= La spagnola =

Italian popular song

"La spagnola" ("The Spanish Maiden" or "The Spanish Girl"), also known as "Stretti stretti, nell'estasi d'amor", is a popular Italian song dated to 1906, written by Neapolitan "tarantellist" Vincenzo Di Chiara.

== Lyrics ==
According to the official journal of the National Association of Teachers of Singing, the song is about "a Spanish beauty who believes in her powers of love".

== Recordings ==
"La spagnola"
A recording by Beniamino Gigli.

The performers of this song included Beniamino Gigli, Claudio Villa and Gigliola Cinquetti, among many others. Nat King Cole and others used the tune as the basis for their popular song "Buon Natale (Means a Merry Christmas to You)".
