= Vincenzo Di Chiara =

Italian singer and composer (1864–1937)

Vincenzo Di Chiara (1864-Naples, 1937) was an Italian amateur operatic baritone and composer of popular art songs. He made his mark with one song "La spagnola" which was a worldwide hit and was recorded by Rosa Ponselle.
