= Bachir Yellès =

Algerian painter (1921–2022)

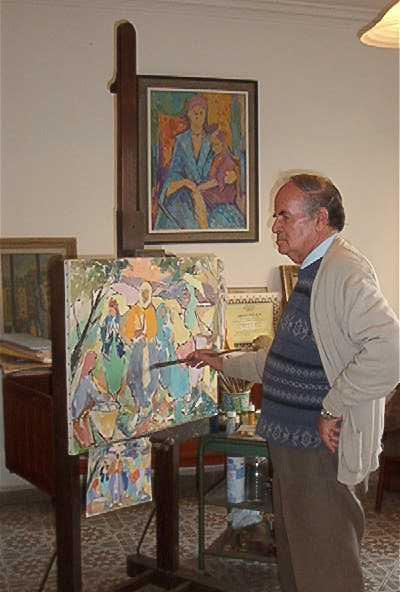
- Born: 12 September 1921; Tlemcen, Algeria
- Died: 16 August 2022 (aged 100); Algiers, Algeria
- Education: School of Fine Arts, Algiers * École des Beaux-Arts, Paris
- Occupation: Painter
- Known for: Director of the École supérieure des Beaux-Arts d'Alger (1960–1980)
- Style: Cubism, Expressionism, Fauvism

Bachir Yellès (Arabic: بشير يلس; 12 September 1921 – 16 August 2022) was an Algerian painter.

== Life and career ==
Yellès was born in Tlemcen on 12 September 1921. He studied at the School of Fine Arts in Algiers, then the Ecole de Beaux-Arts in Paris. He served as a director of the École supérieur des Beaux Arts d'Alger of Algiers, between the years 1960 and 1980. In his works, he continued using local themes but also experimented with Cubism, Expressionism, and Fauvism. Yellès turned 100 in September 2021. He died in Algiers on 16 August 2022.

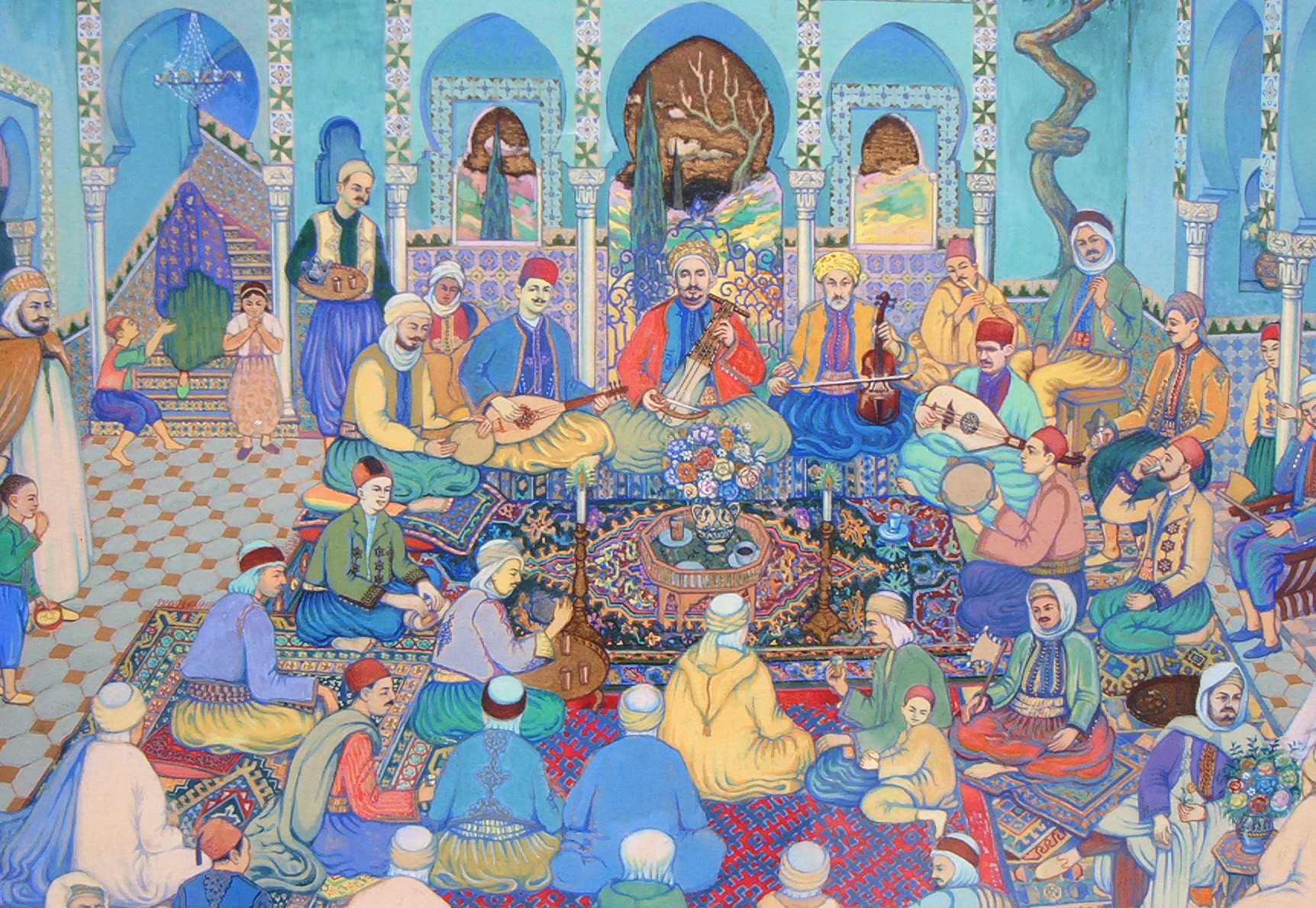
Andalusian musicians in Tlemcen by Bachir Yellès
