= Joseph Sintès =

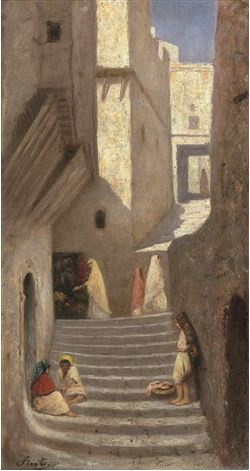
In the Casbah of Algiers

Joseph Sintès (1829, Alaior – 1913, Algiers) was a Spanish-born painter who lived in Algeria. He is known for his urban scenes and landscapes in Orientalist style.

== Biography ==
His family emigrated to Algeria in the early 1830s during a period when many Menorcans went there to meet the need for horticulturists, arboriculturists and market gardeners.

At the beginning of his career, he benefitted from the advice of several French painters there, including Horace Vernet, who was painting scenes from the recent military conquest. At first, he painted portraits for wealthy clients who were vacationing in North Africa; many from Scandinavia. Among his notable sitters were Prince Louis of Battenberg, Alfred I, Prince of Windisch-Grätz and Aimé, duc de Clermont-Tonnerre.

He subsequently served as a Professor at the École supérieure des beaux-arts d'Alger. He was offered the position of Director on several occasions, but declined, as doing so would have required him to exchange his Spanish nationality for French citizenship.

Today, he is best remembered as a painter of daily life and landscapes in and around Algiers. His most familiar works are street scenes from inside the Casbah.

Many of his paintings may be seen at the National Museum of Fine Arts of Algiers. In 2003–2004, some were presented at an exhibition of French-Algerian art at the Louvre. A major retrospective was held in Alaior in 2006.
