= Paul Jouve =

French painter and sculptor (1878–1973)

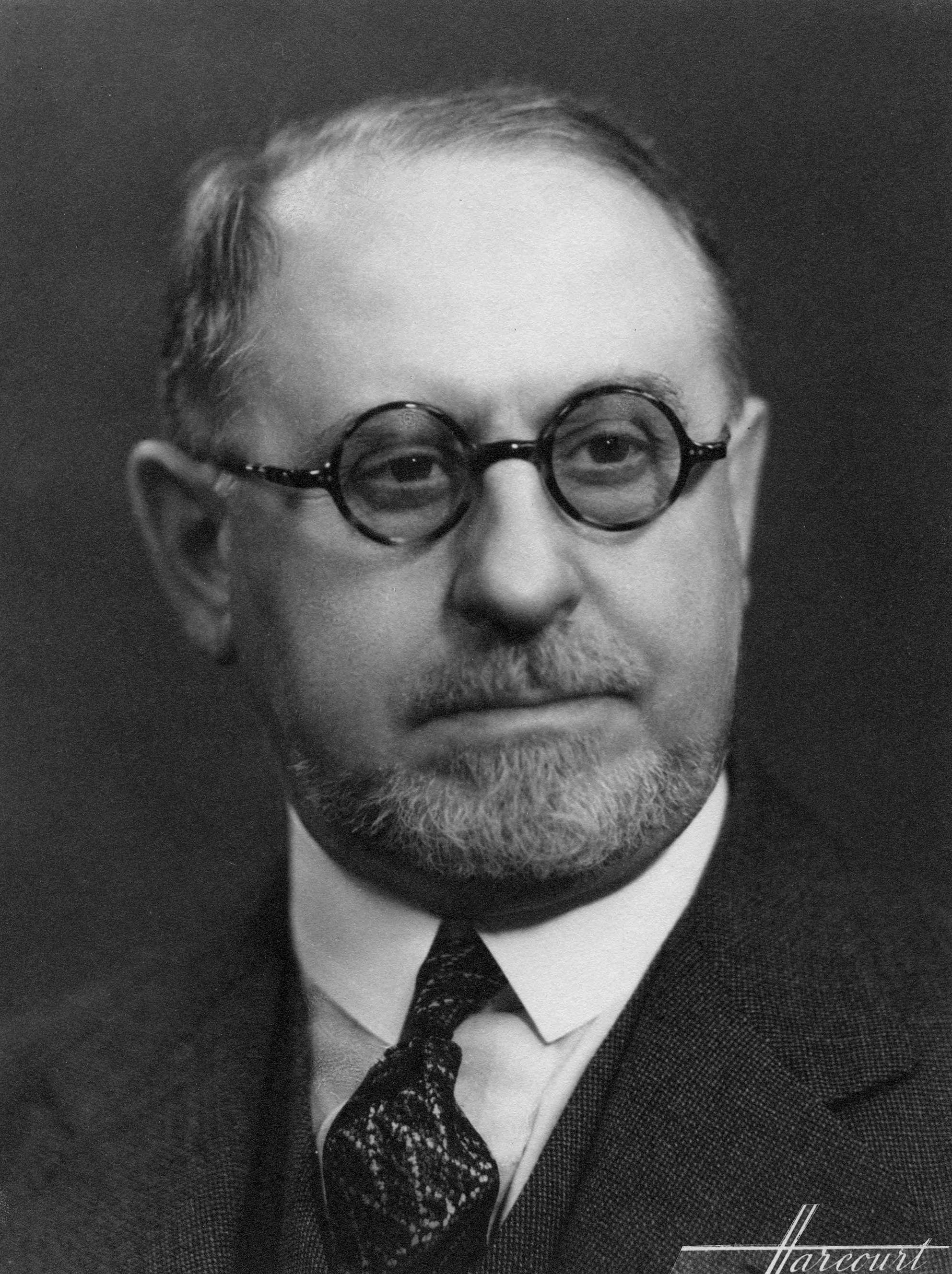

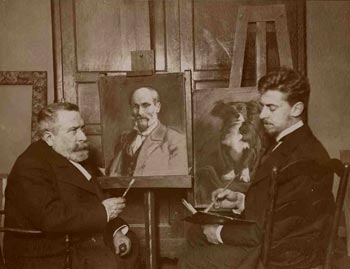
Paul Jouve (right) and his father Auguste (1905)

Pierre-Paul Jouve (Marlotte, Seine-et-Marne, 16 March 1878 – Paris, 13 May 1973) was a French painter, sculptor and illustrator. He was notable for his paintings and sculptures of Africa's animals. He was first recipient of the Prix Abd-el-Tif in 1907, and later of the Prix d'Indochine in 1921.

== Biography ==
Paul Jouve was two years old when his father set up his ceramist workshop on Boulevard Saint Jacques in Paris. It is in this artistic universe that he grew up playing with colors, modeling the earth, pampered by his young mother, who dreamed of making a teacher of her. Very early on, his father, seeing his passion for drawing, encouraged him, introduced him to the Jardin des Plantes, where he developed a passion for the big cats that he practiced drawing.

For the Universal Exhibition of 1900, the architect Binet, commissioned a frieze of wild animals of more than 100m representing tigers, bears, lions, bulls, and mouflons. This frieze will be executed in greenish brown glazed flamed sandstone by the sculptor Alexandre Bigot. Binet also ordered four lions from him to decorate the main gate of the Champs Elysees, between the two palaces, and a monumental statue representing a rooster wings outstretched in the center of the gate.

In 1907, Jouve was awarded a scholarship from the General Government of Algeria, and along with Léon Cauvy he was the first resident of Villa Abd-el-Tif in Algiers. The Contemporary Book Society commissioned him to illustrate Rudyard Kipling's Jungle Book, which was not published until 1919.

Jouve won the General Government of Indochina travel grant and made a major trip to the Far East. At the end of the summer of 1922, he embarked from Marseille as a painter on a mission representing France for a long journey of eleven months which would lead him successively to Indochina, China, Ceylon, then to India. He stayed in Angkor for nearly three months, fascinated by the beauty and grandeur of the site. He brought back from this trip hundreds of studies which served him among other things to illustrate, Le Pellerin d'Angkor by Pierre Loti.

== Gallery ==
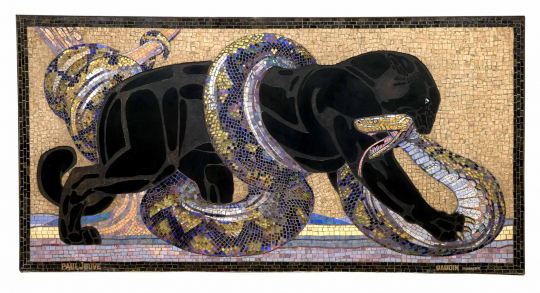
Black panther fighting a python, 1932.Mosaic by Gaudin, after a drawing by Paul Jouve. Collection of the Institut de France
