= Spagnoli =

Spagnoli is an Italian surname meaning "Spaniard", "Spanish" or "from Spain". Notable people with the name include:

- Giuseppe Spagnoli (1947–2003), Italian wrestler
- Jerry Spagnoli (born 1956), American daguerreotype photographer
- Luisa Spagnoli (1877–1935), Italian businesswoman
- Pietro Spagnoli (born 1964), Italian operatic baritone
