= Léon Cauvy =

French painter (1874–1933)

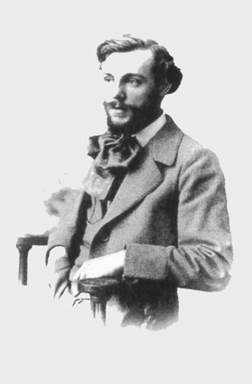
- Léon Cauvy in the late 1890s
- Born: 12 January 1874; Montpellier, France
- Died: 3 January 1933 (aged 58); Algiers, French Algeria
- Education: École des Beaux-arts
- Movement: Orientalist, genre scenes

Léon Cauvy (12 January 1874 – 3 January 1933) was a French Orientalist painter.

== Biography ==
He was born in Montpellier. He began his studies in 1890 at the local School of Fine Arts; winning several awards for his sketches and ink wash paintings, although his interests soon turned to decorative work. Later, he went to Paris and spent some time studying with Albert Maignan at the École des Beaux-arts.

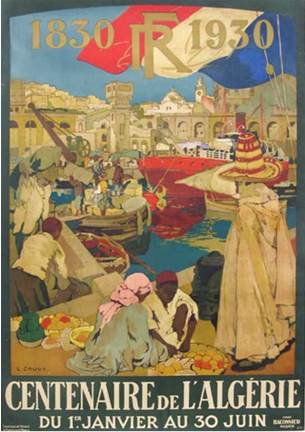
Centennial Poster

He participated in the Salon from 1901 to 1903. At the Salon of 1907, he was awarded third place. That same year, he and Paul Jouve became the first winners of the Prix Abd-el-Tif. One of the benefits of the prize was a year's stay at the Villa Abd-el-Tif in Algiers.

He was already thirty-years old and had a promising career in France, but immediately became enamored of North Africa. He exhibited fifty of his paintings at an Orientalist exhibition in Paris in 1909 and, pleased with their reception, decided to remain in Algeria. Shortly after, he became Director of the École des Beaux-arts d'Alger; a position he held until his death.

In 1925, he was placed in charge of decorating the Algerian Pavilion at the International Exhibition of Modern Decorative and Industrial Arts. After the exhibition, his works were moved to the "Palais d’Été"; official home and headquarters for the French admirals in Algiers (A building that would later be the scene for the assassination of François Darlan).

Five years later, he designed the poster commemorating one-hundred years of French rule in Algeria. Thirty-thousand copies were made and distributed worldwide. This was followed by several more poster designs, for shipping companies in the tourist trade.

In 1932, for his last major work, he created a large canvas depicting the Ouled Naïls that was shown at the Salon of the Société des Artistes Français. Since 1990, it has been on display at the Musée des Années Trente. Overall, he concentrated on scenes of daily life as opposed to the more "exotic" aspects of Arab culture. Many of his paintings have the appearance of tapestries.

== Selected paintings ==
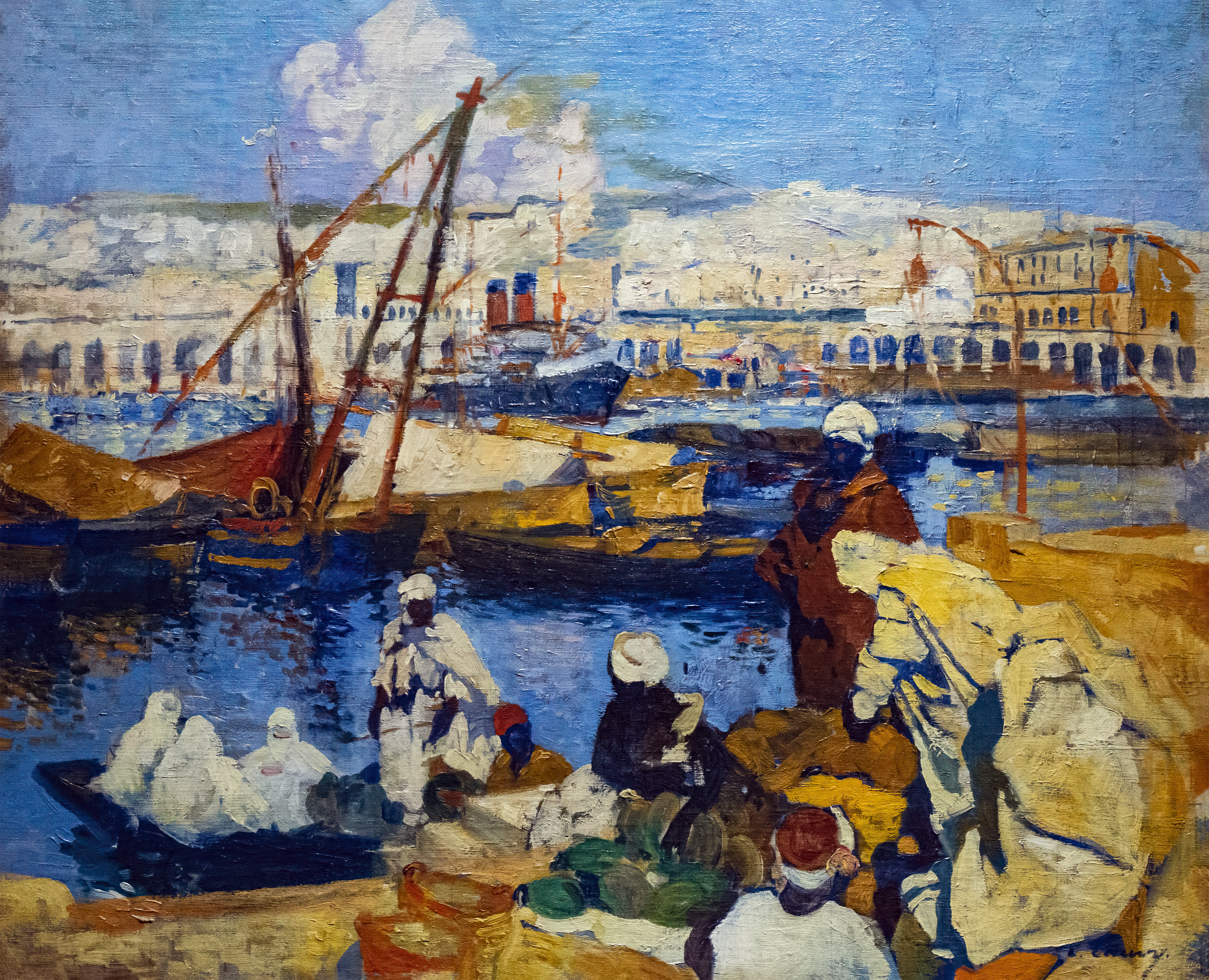
Boarding at the port of Algiers (Musée d'Art et d'Histoire de Narbonne)

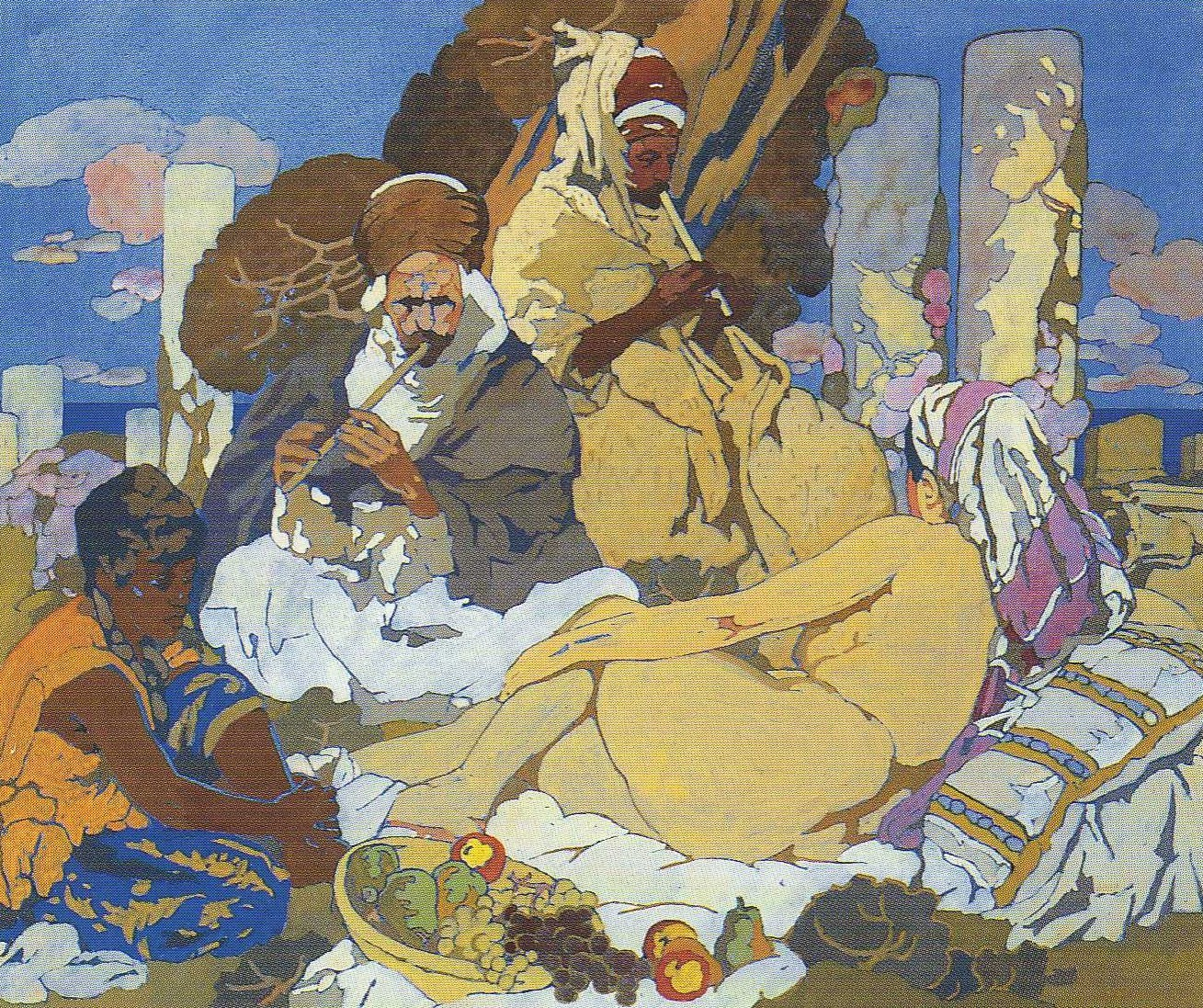
Idyll in Tipaza

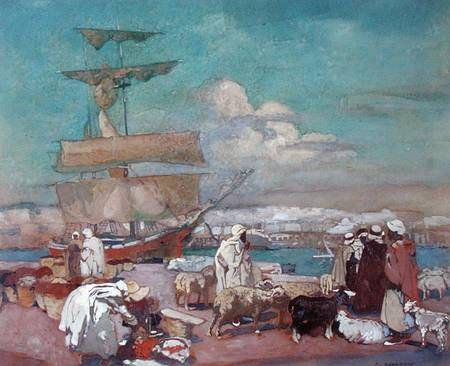
The Port of Algiers

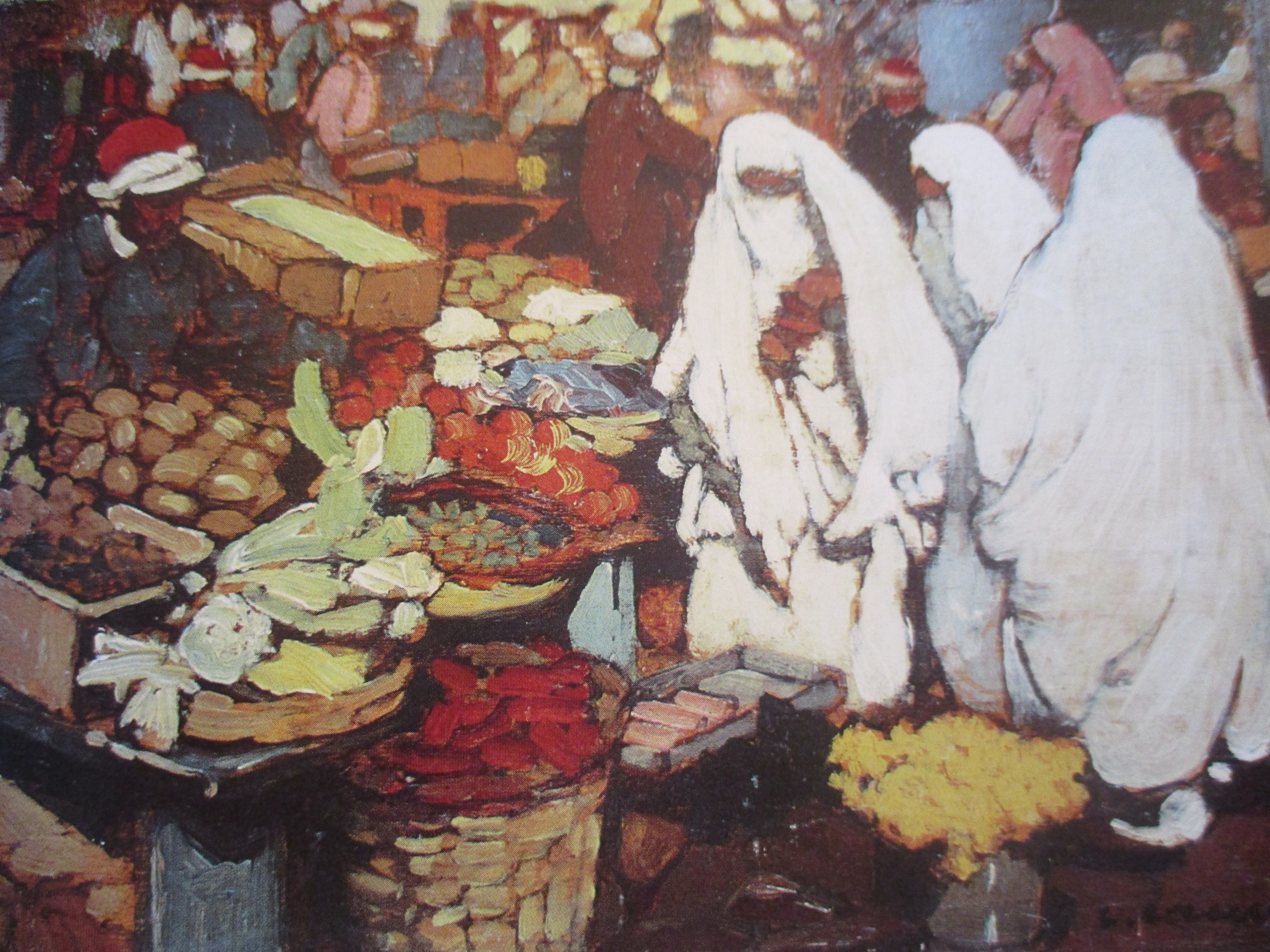
In the Market

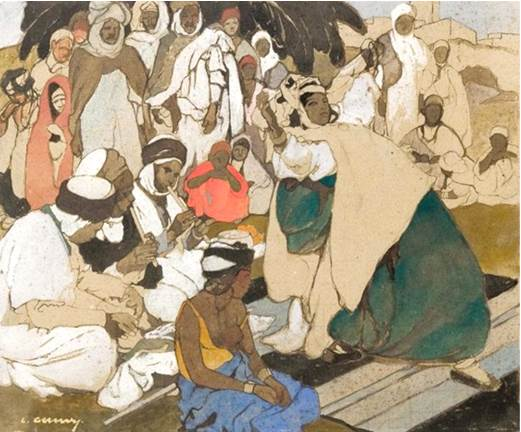
Algerian Dancer

== See also ==
- List of Orientalist artists
- Orientalism
