= Miniature art =

Very small artworks

Miniature chair; by Peter Carl Fabergé; made between 1896 and 1906; Gold, silver gilt, enamel over engine turned ground simulating brocaded textile, rubies and diamonds; overall: 10.5 x 5.3 x 4.8 cm; Cleveland Museum of Art (USA)

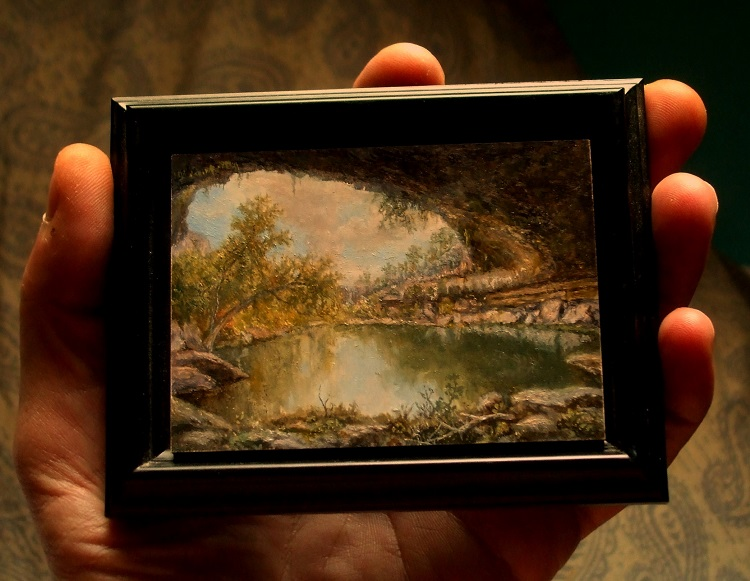
Miniature oil painting of Hamilton Pool, Texas Hill Country; oil on 2.5 x 3.5 in. panel

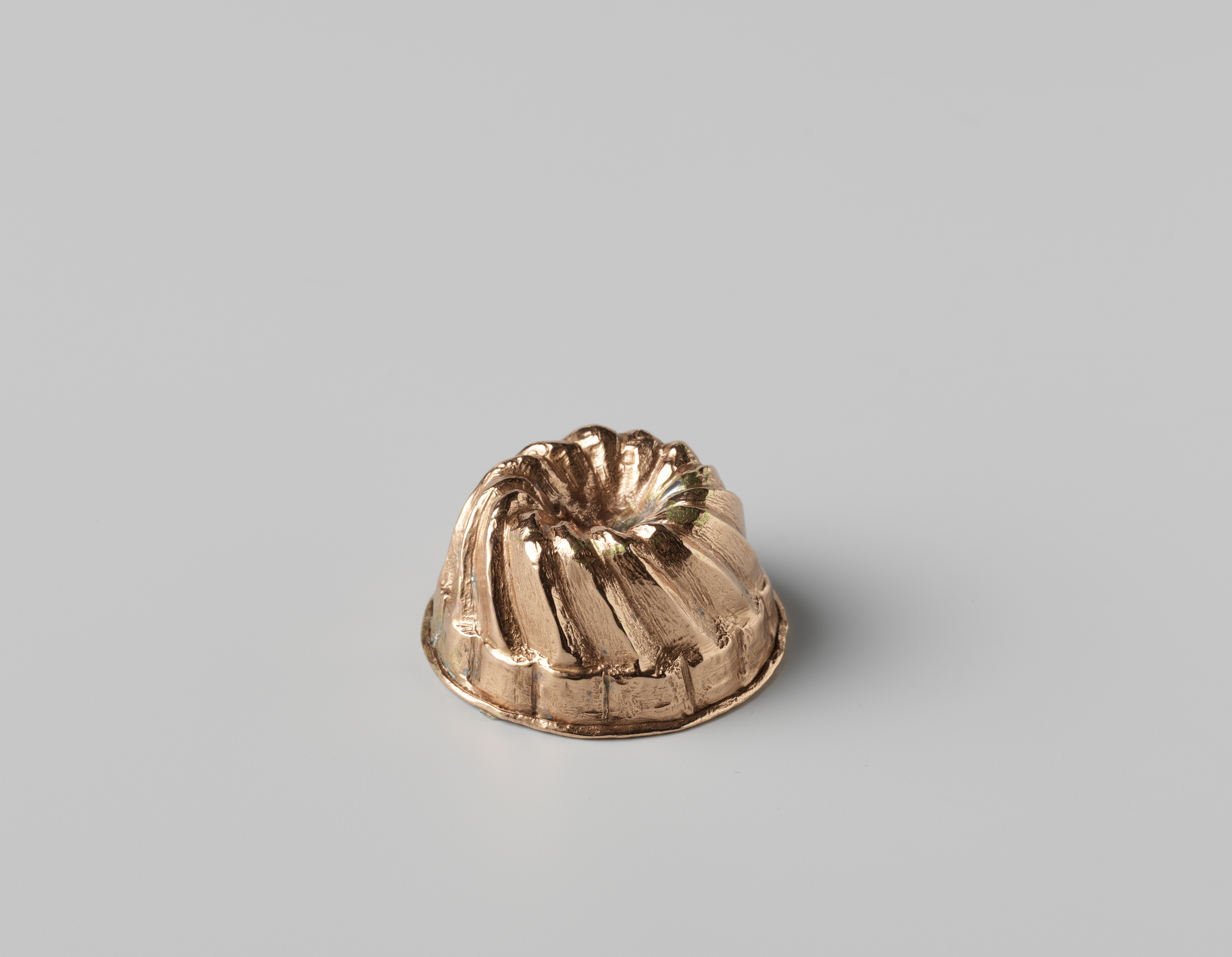
Miniature cooking shape; circa 1700-1799; copper; 1.8 × 3.7 cm; Rijksmuseum (Amsterdam, the Netherlands)

Miniature art includes paintings, engravings and sculptures that are very small; it has a long history that dates back to prehistory.

== Genre ==
The portrait miniature is the most common form in recent centuries, and from ancient times, engraved gems, often used as impression seals, and cylinder seals in various materials were very important. For example most surviving examples of figurative art from the Indus Valley civilization and in Minoan art are very small seals. Gothic boxwood miniatures are very small carvings in wood, used for rosary beads and the like.

Western paintings in illuminated manuscripts are known as miniatures, even if not very small - this sense of the word in fact has a different derivation, from a Latin word for a reddish pigment. Miniature art has been made for over 2500 years and is prized by collectors. Museums around the world have collections of miniature paintings, drawings, original prints and etchings, and sculpture.

Miniature art societies, such as the World Federation of Miniaturists (WFM) and Royal Miniature Society, provide applicable of the maximum size covered by the term. An often-used definition is that a piece of miniature art can be held in the palm of the hand, or that it covers less than 25 square inches or 100 cm². Some exhibits require the subjects to be depicted in 1/6 actual size, and in all paintings the spirit of miniaturisation should be maintained.

== Collecting ==
Miniature Art Societies hold annual shows around the world. The Miniature Painters, Sculptors & Gravers Society of Washington, DC, is the oldest miniature art society in the USA. The Miniature Art Society of Florida is possibly one of the largest miniature art shows in the USA. Galleries such as Seaside Art Gallery, The Snowgoose Gallery, and the Ciders Painters of America also hold annual exhibitions where visitors are invited to view the paintings and sculptures under magnifying lenses.

== Artists ==
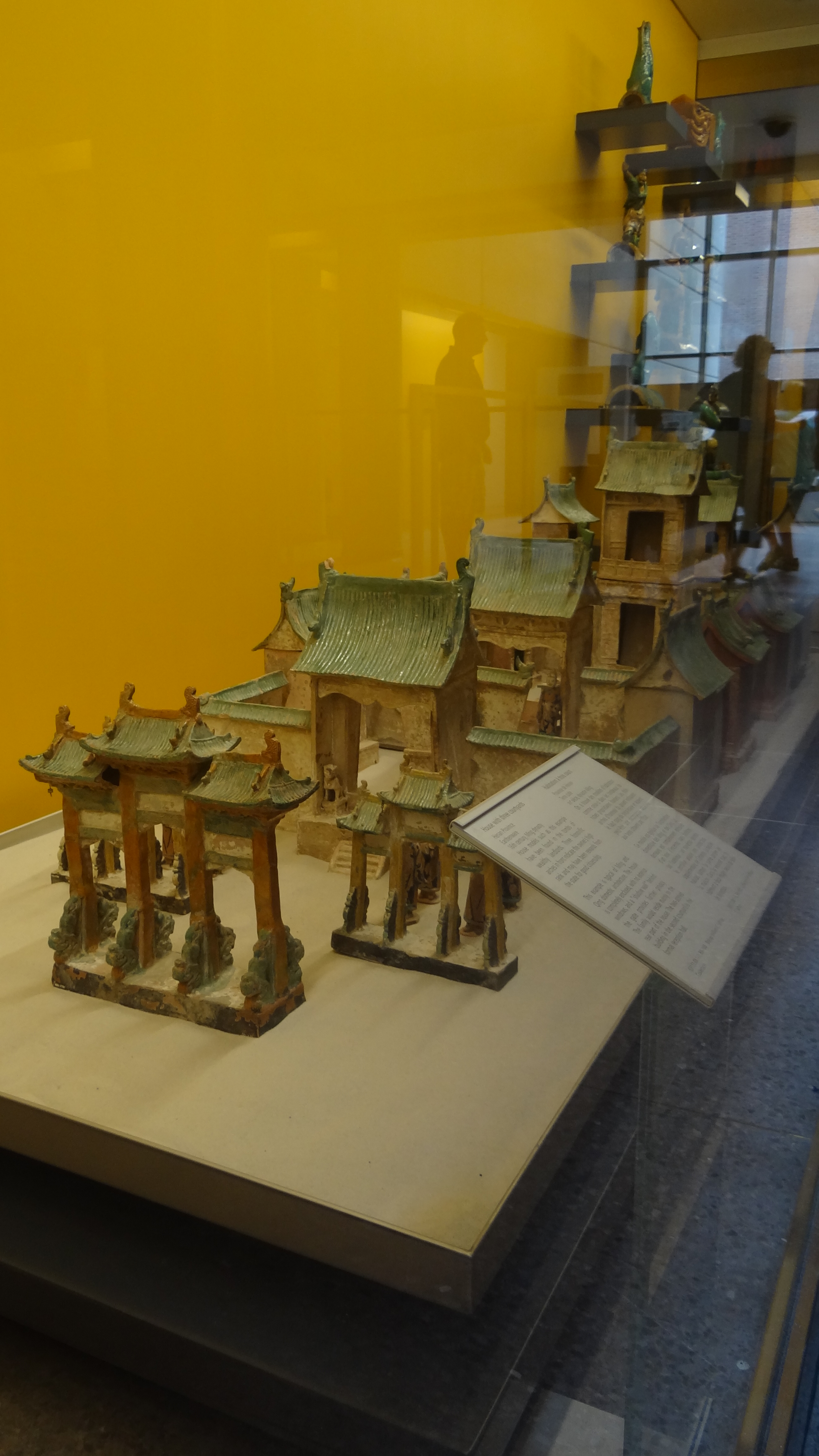
Ming dynasty glazed ceramic model of a courtyard

Artists known for working in miniature include:

- Reza Abbasi (Iran)
- Bashir Ahmed (Pakistan)
- Andreas Alariesto (Finland)
- Nikolai Aldunin (Russia)
- Chrysoula Argyros (South Africa)
- Neşe Aybey (Turkey)
- Christian Backer-Owe (Norway)
- Hans Bol (the Netherlands)
- Dina Brodsky (US)
- Moshe Bromberg (Poland)
- Abdullah Buhari (Turkey)
- Edward Burch (UK)
- Louie Burrell (UK)
- Anna Maria Carew (UK)
- Joan Carlile (UK)
- Nihâl Chand (India)
- Penelope Cleyn (UK)
- Nusret Çolpan (Turkey)
- Richard Cosway (UK)
- Suzanne Crowley (US)
- Jacques Daliwe (France)
- Kurchi Dasgupta (India)
- Saryu Doshi (India)
- Miss Archibald Ramsay Douglas (UK)
- Amy Drucker (UK)
- Mahmoud Farshchian (Iran)
- Sarah C. Frothingham (US)
- Fernando García del Molino (Argentina)
- Aman Singh Gulati (India)
- Mabel Lee Hankey (UK)
- Solomon Hart (UK)
- Richard William Haynes (US)
- Joris Hoefnagel (the Netherlands)
- Gulshan Hossain (Bangladesh)
- Margaret Hicks (US)
- Jonty Hurwitz (UK, South Africa)
- Anatoly Konenko (Russia)
- Abdulcelil Levni (Turkey)
- Karen Latham (US)
- Ludwik Marteau (Poland)
- Gábor Melegh (Austria)
- Willard M. Mitchell (Canada)
- Dust Muhammad (Safavid Era)
- Mir Musavvir (Safavid Era)
- Matrakçı Nasuh (Turkey)
- Nakkaş Osman (Turkey)
- Peter Paillou (UK)
- Mohamed Ranem (Algeria)
- Mallikarjuna Reddy (India)
- Mir Sayyid Ali (Afghanistan)
- Gopal Prasad Sharma (India)
- Elisabeth Barbara Schmetterling (the Netherlands)
- Hagop Sandaldjian (Egypt)
- Varunika Saraf (India)
- Henry Saxon (UK)
- Suvigya Sharma (India)
- Graham Short (UK)
- Kostandin Shpataraku (Albania)
- Nakkaş Sinan Bey (Turkey)
- Pyotr Sokolov (Russia)
- Gunasekaran Sundarraj (India)
- Magda Szabo (Canada)
- Waleria Tarnowska (Poland)
- Sumaira Tazeen (Pakistan)
- Mohamed Temam (Algeria)
- Élisabeth Terroux (Switzerland)
- John Thirtle (UK)
- Henry Tanworth Wells (UK)
- Willard Wigan (UK)
- Members of the Royal Society of Miniature Painters, Sculptors and Gravers

== See also ==
- Scale model
- Diorama
- Room box
- Dollhouse
- Model building
- Miniature faking
- Portrait miniature
- Miniature food
- Model figure
- Akan goldweights
- Ottoman miniature
- Artist trading cards
- Netsuke
- Mstyora miniature
- Wasli
- List of gold-glass portraits
