= Micro miniature =

Microscopic artworks

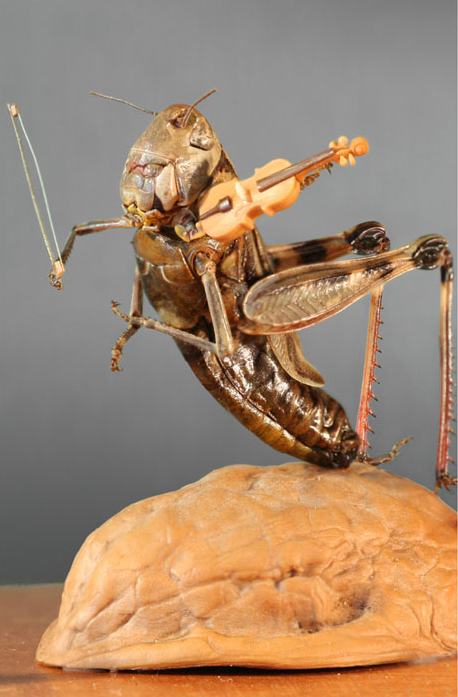
Micro miniature: grasshopper playing on the violin

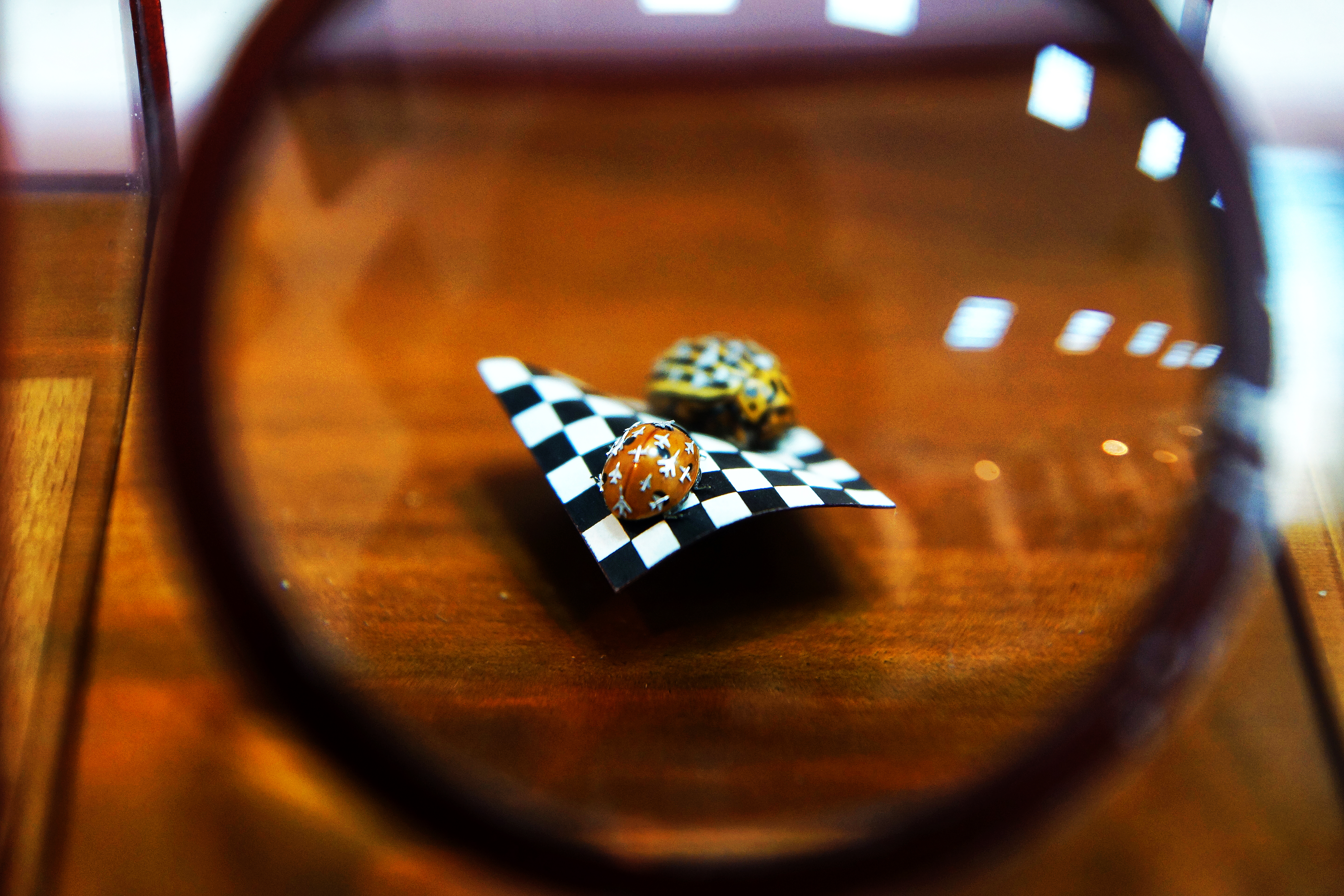
Microminiature sculpture by Vladimir Aniskin

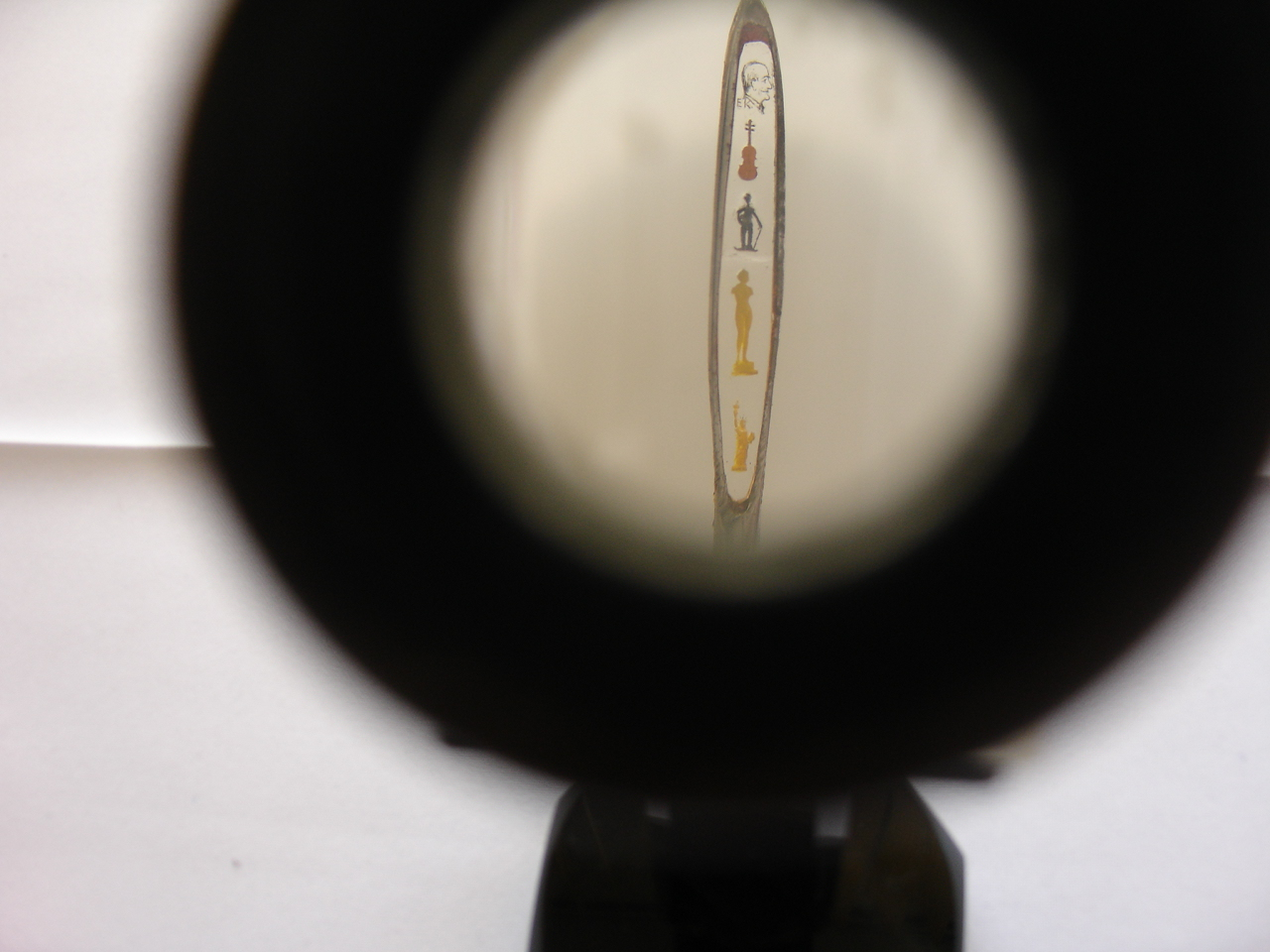
Micro miniature in the eye of a needle by Edward Ter-Ghazarian

Micro miniature (also called micro art or micro sculpture) is a fine art form. Micro miniatures are made with the assistance of microscopes, or eye surgeon tools. It originated at the end of 20th century.

== Museums ==
The National Museum of Toys and Miniatures in Kansas City, Missouri has micro-miniatures in its permanent collection and in their exhibit titled Micro Curiosities, a permanent exhibit displaying the work of several fine-scale miniature artists.

The Metropolitan Museum of Art in New York City holds a micro-miniature basket made by a Pomo Native American artist around 1910.

The Museum of Jurassic Technology in Culver City, California has a collection of the microminiatures of the Armenian artist Hagop Sandaldjian in their permanent exhibition, The Eye of the Needle.

The Museum of Miniatures located in Prague focuses on works of microminiature art. It features the work of Edward Ter Ghazarian, Anatoly Konenko, Nikolai Aldunin among others.

The Museum of Microminiatures in St. Petersburg includes micro-miniature work by Vladimir Aniskin of Novosibirsk, Siberia, as well as Nikolai Aldunin of Moscow.

== Artists ==
- Nikolai Aldunin
- Vladimir Aniskin
- Anatoly Konenko
- Mallikarjuna Reddy
- Hagop Sandaldjian
- Graham Short
- Willard Wigan
