= Mallikarjuna =

Mallikarjuna is a name of the Hindu god Shiva.

Mallikarjuna may also refer to:

== People ==
- Mallikarjuna (Shilahara dynasty), a 12th-century Indian ruler
- Mallikarjuna Rao (disambiguation), several people
- Mallikarjuna Raya, 15th century Indian ruler
- Mallikarjuna Reddy, Indian sculptors

== Shiva temples ==
- Mallikarjuna Jyotirlinga in Andhra Pradesh, India
- Mallikarjuna Temple, Goa in Goa, India
- Mallikarjuna Temple, Basaralu in Karnataka, India
- Mallikarjuna Temple, Kuruvatti in Karnataka, India
- Mallikarjuna Temple, Hirenallur in Karnataka, India
- Komuravelli Mallikarjuna Swamy Temple in Telangana, India

== Other ==
- Mallikarjuna (film), a 2011 Indian Kannada language film
