= Schmetterling =

Schmetterling is a surname. Notable people with the surname include:

- Elisabeth Barbara Schmetterling (1801–1882), Dutch artist
- Lauren Schmetterling (born 1988), American rower

Schmetterling may also refer to:

- Henschel Hs 117 Schmetterling, a surface-to-air missile developed during World War II
