= Gopal Sharma =

Gopal Sharma may refer to:

- Gopal Sharma (cricketer)
- Gopal Sharma (Indian politician)
- Gopal Sharma (Nepalese politician)
- Gopal Prasad Sharma (born 1964), Indian artist
