= Miniature =

A miniature is a small-scale reproduction, or a small version. It may refer to:

- Portrait miniature, a miniature portrait painting
- Miniature art, miniature painting, engraving and sculpture
  - Miniature food, small edible or inedible versions of food
- Miniature (chess), a short chess game, typically with no more than 25 moves.
- Miniature (illuminated manuscript), a small painting in an illuminated text
  - Arabic miniature, a small painting in an illuminated text
  - Armenian miniature, a small painting in an illuminated text
  - Persian miniature, a small painting in an illuminated text or album
  - Ottoman miniature, a small painting in an illuminated text or album
    - Contemporary Turkish miniature, painting
  - Mughal miniature, a small painting in an illuminated text or album
- Scale model
  - Room box
  - Figurine
  - Miniature figure (gaming), a small figurine used in role playing games and tabletop wargames
- Miniature (alcohol), a very small bottle of an alcoholic drink
- Miniature rose
- Miniature candy, smaller variations of candy bars and candy
- Miniature effect, a physical model of a larger object used to represent it in filmmaking
- Miniature horse, a very small breed of horse
- Miniature poodle, a smaller breed of poodle (dog)
- Mini ature, a species of frog

== Entertainment ==
- Miniatures (Alog album), 2005
- Miniatures (Nekropolis album), 1989
- Miniatures (video game), 2024
- Miniature (album), a 1988 album by Tim Berne
- "Miniature" (The Twilight Zone), a 1963 episode of The Twilight Zone
