= Edward Bushel =

Edward Bushel may refer to:

- Edward Bushel, juror in Bushel's Case
- Edward Bushel, allegedly husband of Mary Seymour, daughter of Catherine Parr, Henry VIII's sixth wife
