= Temam =

Temam is a surname. Notable people with the surname include:

- Mohamed Temam (1915–1988), Algerian painter
- Roger Temam (born 1940), French mathematician now teaching in the United States
