= Malbone (surname) =

Malbone is a surname. Notable people with the surname include:

- Francis Malbone (1759–1809), American merchant and politician
- Edward Greene Malbone (1777–1807), American portrait miniaturist
