= Miniature Painters, Sculptors and Gravers Society of Washington =

The Miniature Painters, Sculptors and Gravers Society of Washington, D.C. (MPSGS) is an artists organization founded in 1931 that is dedicated fine art miniatures. This miniature art society is headquartered in Washington, DC but includes members from around the world.

== History ==
The organization is an invitation-only organization dedicated to the promotion and encouragement of the practice of producing fine art in miniature. This miniature art society is headquartered in Washington, DC but includes members from around the world. Founded in 1931 by Alyn Williams, the Society is the second-oldest organization of its kind in the world next to the Royal Society of Miniature Painters, Sculptors and Gravers in London, England also founded by Mr. Williams. It is the oldest active organization of miniaturists in the United States.

Miniaturists are considered for membership in the Society after their works have been accepted in the Annual MPSGS International Exhibition in three shows or when they have been awarded a first, second, or third prize in the exhibition. As of 2000, the Society consisted of 48 Resident Members and 142 Associate Members from all over the world. There are ten Emeritus Members and five Auxiliary Members (non-artists). Society members offer exhibitions, lectures, videos, demonstrations and workshops.

The MPSGS also provides stipends for talented and deserving art students in visual arts graduating from the Duke Ellington School of the Arts in Washington, D.C. The origin of these scholarship funds was the proceeds from sales of the first miniature book on miniaturizing, Art in Miniature, written and published by MPSGS member and past President, Margaret T. Hicks.

The Society holds an International Exhibition of Fine Art Miniatures for six weeks in November and December at the Strathmore Hall Arts Center in North Bethesda, Maryland.
