= Pari Miniature =

Azerbaijani miniature painter (born 1976)

- Born: Parinisa Fazil gizi Asgarova; 16 October 1976 (age 50); Babek district of Nakhchivan AR
- Citizenship: Soviet Union; Azerbaijan
- Education: Sattar Bahlulzade; Faiq Əkbərov
- Known for: miniature painter
- Children: 1
- Elected: Union of Artists of Azerbaijan

- Pari Miniature, who introduced our country to France with her works - Video report.
- What codes and symbols are hidden in the miniatures? - Pari Miniature.
- The greatest freedom is the freedom within a person - artist Pari Miniature.

Pari Miniature (Azerbaijani: Parinisa Fazil gizi Asgarova; 16 October 1976, Babek district of Nakhchivan AR) — is a member of the Union of Artists of Azerbaijan, an Azerbaijani artist, the author of more than 1000 works, an Azerbaijani female miniature artist., follower of the classical Tabriz miniature school.

== Her life and education ==
Pari Miniature was born on October 16, 1976, in Babek district of Nakhchivan AR. In 1983, the artist received her primary education at the secondary school of Tazakend, Babek region, and completed her secondary education in 1993. In 1981–1991, she received her higher education at the Azerbaijan State University of Culture and Arts, where a number of new specialties were opened in painting, graphics, sculpture, art studies, as well as theater, cinema, culturology and artistic industrial arts, in 1993–1997.

Pari Miniature has been a member of the Union of Artists of Azerbaijan since 2013.

== Activity ==
Pari Miniature is one of the worthy successors of the miniature art registered in UNESCO as a common intangible cultural heritage of Azerbaijan, Turkey, Iran and Uzbekistan in 2020. During her university years, the artist studied the intricacies of the miniature carpet system with the help of her teacher, and devoted herself to miniature art.

A number of international exhibitions of Pari Miniature were held in different years in Azerbaijan, as well as in many countries, and it was also a participant in many international exhibitions:

- In 2000, a solo exhibition was held in Turkey.
- In 2012, a personal exhibition was held at "Creative Center".
- In 2013, she participated in the "Azerbaijan Art Festival-2013" project.
- In 2013, she participated in the "I Republican Exhibition of Martial Artists".
- In 2013, she was a participant in the miniature exhibition of "Khatai Art Center".
- In 2014, she was an exhibitor at the "Traditional Arts/Evolution" exhibition.
- In 2016, Istanbul was a participant in the festival exhibition called "International 12th Traditional Artists' Meeting".
- In 2016, she participated in the "Azerbaijan Literary and Artistic Resources" project at the Baku International Center for Multiculturalism.
- In 2018, a solo exhibition "Classic and modern miniatures" was held in Istanbul. 31 works of Pari Miniature were shown at the exhibition. The exhibition was attended by Ibrahim Kalın, the chief advisor of Turkish President Recep Tayyip Erdogan and his family, Umit Meriç, the daughter of the writer Cemil Meriç, and other well-known figures.
- In 2023, her paintings were exhibited at the "Gurama Art" exhibition organized within the framework of the II National Gurama Festival at the Baku House of Photography (BFE).

Pari Miniature, who was the illustrator of the book "Ghazals suivis de aphorismes" published in France in 2021, was awarded the International Forum badge.

The last solo exhibition of Pari Miniature called "Love of Color" was organized by the Ministry of Culture and the Union of Artists at the Union of Artists. More than 130 works by the artist were displayed at the exhibition. Ms. Pari is an illustrator of about 30 books.

The author of the presentation drawing for the 1st Republican Forum of Young Ethnographers, organized by the "Genocide Memorial Complex" in the city of Guba on June 5-6, 2025, is Pari Miniature.

Peri Miniature is also the author of the presentation image of the 2nd Republic Forum of Young Ethnographers, which was dedicated to the topic of 'Community, Culture, and Scientific Cooperation' and held in Lankaran on March 16–17, 2026, as well as the cover image of the 'Ancient Land' international scientific journal for this forum.
