= Miniaturist =

Miniaturist may refer to:

- a painter of portrait miniatures
- a painter of miniatures in illuminated manuscripts
- one who makes miniature art

== See also ==
- Miniature (disambiguation)
- Miniature painting (disambiguation)
