= Margaret Hicks =

American painter

Margaret Turner Hicks (September 28, 1923 – August 3, 2006) was a producer and promoter of Miniature Art.

Favoring representational art, Hicks painted landscapes and still lifes and the occasional portrait, using small brushes and a magnifying glass to achieve a high level of detail in paintings that were often just 2 to 4 inches wide.

Hicks often lectured on Miniature Art and was President of the Miniature Painters, Sculptors and Gravers Society of Washington from 1983 to 1988. In 1993 she published a miniature book on the topic — measuring just 2 7/8 by 2 5/8 inches — called Art in Miniature. As a collector of miniature books, Hicks "felt it would make a lot of sense" to do a miniature book on art in miniature. The book covers small-scale painting, sculpture, and engraving. All proceeds from the book went to a scholarship program for Washington DC high school students planning to study art.

Hicks' paintings and other artwork were exhibited in Washington and Baltimore, London, Japan, and at the U.S. Embassy in Gambia. Several of her pieces were among the more than 500 works in an international exhibition of miniature art she helped organize at the Smithsonian Institution's S. Dillon Ripley Center in 2004.

Margaret Turner Hicks was born in Philadelphia. She graduated from Temple University and went on to study art in Germany while her husband (now-retired Army Col. Stanford R. Hicks) was posted overseas. She also taught elementary school and tutored soldiers before becoming a full-time artist in 1968, a year after the couple settled in Washington, DC.

Hicks was an active leader in her community: President of The American Art League in Washington, member of the Arts club of Washington, Arts for Aging, The Miniature Art Society of Washington and other arts and civic groups. In addition to miniature art, she also made jewelry and clothing; her sweaters were known to be especially elaborate. She died of cancer on August 3, 2006.

"There is something fascinating about the exquisite art of miniature painting. The skill of the artist, reflected in the detail and delicate quality of the painting, reveals a world view often overlooked, except by those who take the time to see." — Margaret Hicks, artist's statement
