= Kurchi Dasgupta =

Indian painter, art critic, actor and translator (born 1974)

- Born: Kurchi Dasgupta; 1974; Kolkata, West Bengal, India
- Known for: Visual Art, Art Criticism, Translation, Acting
- Movement: Oil Painting, Conceptual Art, Performance, Miniature
- Awards: University Gold Medal, Jadavpur University (1998)

Kurchi Dasgupta (born 1974 in Kolkata, West Bengal) is an Indian painter, art critic, actor and translator. She currently lives between Kathmandu, Nepal and Kolkata, India.

== Background ==
Dasgupta gained a diploma in commercial art in 1994 and earned a Master of Arts degree in Comparative Literature from Jadavpur University, Kolkata in 1998. She was the chief executive officer of the Society for the Preservation of Satyajit Ray Films (The Ray Society) for two years until 2006. She was also the head of Lotus Print publishing house for three years. She shares her time between Kathmandu and Kolkata at the moment, with her son and husband.

== Selected group exhibitions ==
Upcoming: 2019 Bunte Nachbarinnen Berlin (to be curated by Karla Woisnitza)

2019 Solidarity – Jetzt erst recht ACC Gallery Weimar, Weimar (March – May)

2018 She in South Asia Ganges Art Gallery, Kolkata (which she co-curated) (February)

2017 Things Lost/Remembering the Future Ganges Art Gallery, Kolkata (which she co-curated) (March)

2016 Ardor Indian Cultural Centre, Kolkata (March)

2015 Suladharini Indian Cultural Centre, Kolkata (August)

2014 Understanding Gender Artist Proof Gallery, Kathmandu (March)

2013 United Art Fair in Delhi, India (September)

2013 Kalajatra Siddhartha Art Gallery, Kathmandu, Nepal (August)

2013 Random Reveries Bikalpa Art Center, Kathmandu, Nepal (August)

2013 Objects as Locus of Hybridity and Hybrid Making: Transhistorical, Transcultural, and Global Explorations Tasmeem Doha Design Biennale at Virginia Commonwealth University Qatar (March)

2012 Evolving Within Nepal Art Council, Kathmandu, Nepal (September)

2012 From Portrait to Self-Portrait Kathmandu Center for Contemporary Art, Kathmandu, Nepal (November) (curated by Antonio Nodar)

2012 Rejoicing Spring Manny's Exhibition Space, Kathmandu, Nepal (March)

2011 Ganesha Nepal Art Council, Kathmandu, Nepal (September)

2007 Art in Mind Brick Lane Gallery, London, UK (July)

== Selected solo exhibitions ==
2010 Bishoy Mahabharata The Nehru Centre, Mayfair, London (September).

2010 Bishoy Mahabharata Imago Dei Gallery, Kathmandu (August).

2010 The Mahabharata: An Impression Siddhartha Art Gallery, Kathmandu (January).

2008 World Cinema: A Dialogue Millennium Gallery, London (September).

== Selected curation ==
2019 Over a Glass of Wine (co-curated with Matthew McCarthy) (ACC Gallerie, Weimar, Germany)

2018 She in South Asia (co-curated with Amritah Sen) (Ganges Art Gallery, Kolkata)

2018 Small Histories: Memory as Practice, Memory as Ethics (co-curated with Amritah Sen) (Ganges Art Gallery, Kolkata)

2017 Things Lost/Remembering the Future (co-curated with Amritah Sen) (Ganges Art Gallery, Kolkata)

== Writings ==
She is a regular contributor to magazines and prestigious e-zines, including:

Frieze (London)

Asian Art News (Hong Kong)

Art Asia Pacific (Hong Kong)

Art India (New Delhi)

Art and Deal (New Delhi)

Depart (Dhaka)

Hyperallergic (New York)

Ibraaz (Dubai)

Nukta Art Magazine (Karachi)

The Himalayan Times (Kathmandu)

The Kathmandu Post (Kathmandu)

== Selected residencies ==
2018 ACC Weimar International Studio Program. Weimar (October 2018 – February 2019)

2012 Redefining Kathmandu Valley Lasanaa Art Hub, Kathmandu (April)

== Selected workshops ==
2019 'Unlearning Places'. Haus der Kulturen der Welt, Berlin (January)

2013 'End Violence against Women'. National Academy of Fine Art (October)

2013 'Free Impression: Freedom of Expression'. Workshop with Thomas Kilpper, Lasanaa Live Art Hub, Kathmandu (October).

== Selected talks ==
2019 'Radical Women Artists of South Asia', Albertinum, Dresden, Germany (February)

2019 'Memory as Solidarity', ACC Galerie, Weimar, Germany (February)

2019 Radical Women Artists of South Asia', ACC Galerie, Weimar, Germany (March)

2018 Panelist, 'Writing Recent Exhibition Histories of Large-Scale Recurring Exhibitions in South Asia', Dhaka Art Summit

2014 Panelist, Colombo Art Biennale: "The 'C' Word, Defining Curating Practice" (January 31), "Regional Histories, Regional Art Perspectives" (February 1)

2013 Panelist, AICA (International Art Critics Association) Conference in Colombo, Sri Lanka.

Art in Nepal at AWON (November); Femininity and Sexuality in the works of Women Artists of Nepal at Martin Chautari, Kathmandu

2013 Brief Overview of her works at Tasmeem Doha at Virginia Commonwealth University, Qatar (March)

2012 Importance of Theory in Art Practice, Martin Chautari, Kathmandu (May).

== Published translations ==
2009 A Torn Quilt Tale (translated into English), pub. by National Book Trust, India

2008 Possessions (translated into English), pub. by Sahitya Akademi, India

2004 The Death Trap (translated into English), pub. by Rupa & Co.

== Acting profile ==
One World Theatre productions:

Upcoming: True West (2019)

Three Sisters (2018)

The Laramie Project Ten Years Later(2017)

The Laramie Project(2015)

Telling a Tale (2013)

== See also ==
- Indian art
