= Gulshan Hossain =

Bangladeshi artist

Syeda Marium Gulshan Hossain
- সৈয়দা মরিয়ম গুলশান
- Born: 1962 (age 63–64)
- Occupations: painter and installation

Syeda Marium Gulshan Hossain (Bengali: সৈয়দা মরিয়ম গুলশান হোসেন; born 1962) is a painter and installation artist based in Dhaka, Bangladesh. Her work has been exhibited extensively. She currently serves as an Assistant Professor of the Department of Painting at University of Development Alternative Dhaka and is a member of the International Miniature Art Society of Florida, USA.

== Training and painting style ==
Gulshan started her career as a self-taught artist. It was only later that she started attending numerous workshops and pursued a BFA degree from Dhaka and later a MFA Degree from Winchester School of Art, University of Southampton, UK.

As per the Daily Star, her paintings are inspired by the early 20th-century art movement of Post-Impressionism combined with the philosophies conveyed in the Postmodernism movement. Her subject matters typically encompass nature, history, human sentiments, and sociopolitical issues. She has experimented in printmaking, collagraphs, monoprints, solar plate etchings, and silkscreen.

== Effects of life experiences on her work and frequent subject matters ==
As per the Dhaka Tribune, Gulshan's background and early life experience influences her work greatly. She was born into the Syed family and many of her family members were the victims of the 1971 Liberation War. As noted by the eminent art critic and journalist Fayza Haq, all these have resulted in the artist frequently choosing the Liberation War, human trauma, old architectures, or abandoned mansions as topics of her work.

== Awards and honors ==
- "Grand Award", 16th Asian Art Biennial, at National Academy of Fine & Performing Arts (2014)
- National Award (Bengal Foundation Award) at the National Art Biennial, National Academy of Fine Arts, Dhaka, Bangladesh (2013)
- "Grand prize" and "Star of the Symposium" awards, International Art Symposium Autumn Inspiration Penza, Russia (2012)
- National Award (Dipa Haq Award) at the National Art Biennial, National Academy of Fine Arts, Dhaka, Bangladesh (2007)
- Second Prize in Abstract and Surrealism at the 28th International Miniature Art Competition, Florida, USA (2003)
- Honourable Mention at the 26th International Miniature Art Show, Florida, USA (2001)
- Distinction Short List at the 5th International Miniature Art Biennial, Quebec, Canada (2000)
