= James Frothingham =

American painter (1786–1864)

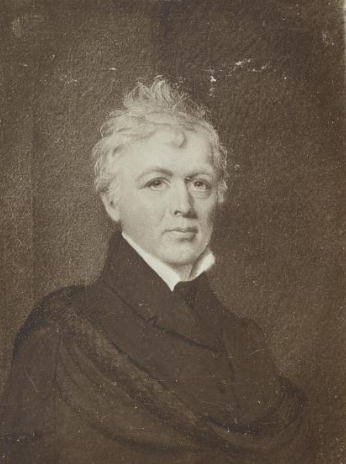
- Frothingham depicted in a portrait by Sarah C. Frothingham, his daughter
- Born: 1786; Charlestown, Massachusetts, U.S.
- Died: January 6, 1864 (aged 77–78)
- Education: Gilbert Stuart
- Known for: Painting

James Frothingham (1786–1864) was an American portrait painter in Massachusetts and New York. He was the father of the painter Sarah C. Frothingham.

== Life and work ==
Frothingham was born in Charlestown, Massachusetts. He began as a chaise painter in his father's chaise manufactory. In the Boston area, he was a student of Gilbert Stuart. In 1888, The Atlantic Monthly described him as "a portraitist of talent", adding that Stuart is quoted as having said of one of Frothingham's head portraits, "No man in Boston but myself can paint so good a head", and that Frothingham was greatly helped by Stuart's criticisms and encouragement, although initially Stuart had advised him to adopt another, less precarious means of earning a livelihood.

The Atlantic noted that there is a detailed portrait of Samuel Dexter by Frothingham in the Harvard Memorial Hall, in which Dexter, wearing a white wig and a red cloak atop a black coat, holds a book in his hand, and appears lost in meditation, saying the flesh coloring in the painting is rather dry and parchment-like, but overall, the color is harmonious. Dunlap noted that heads depicted by James Frothingham were painted with great truth, freedom, and excellence.

He painted a number of likenesses in Salem, Massachusetts, including the wealthy merchant Elias Hasket Derby. Frothingham would have been a regional competitor to the younger Chester Harding (1792–1866), but moved to Brooklyn in New York City in 1826.

In 1828, he was elected into the National Academy of Design as an associate member, and became a full academician in 1831.

Frothingham was the subject of a portrait bust by Joanna Quiner. His own portrait of her is held by the Beverly Public Library in Beverly, Massachusetts.

== Selection of portraits ==
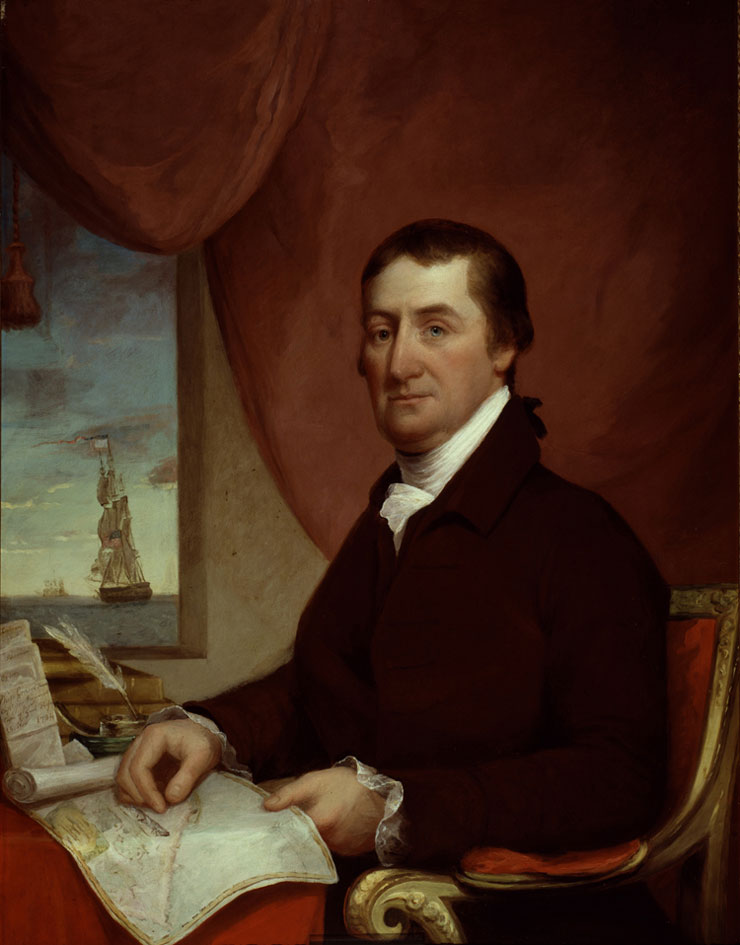
Elias Hasket Derby, 1800-1825

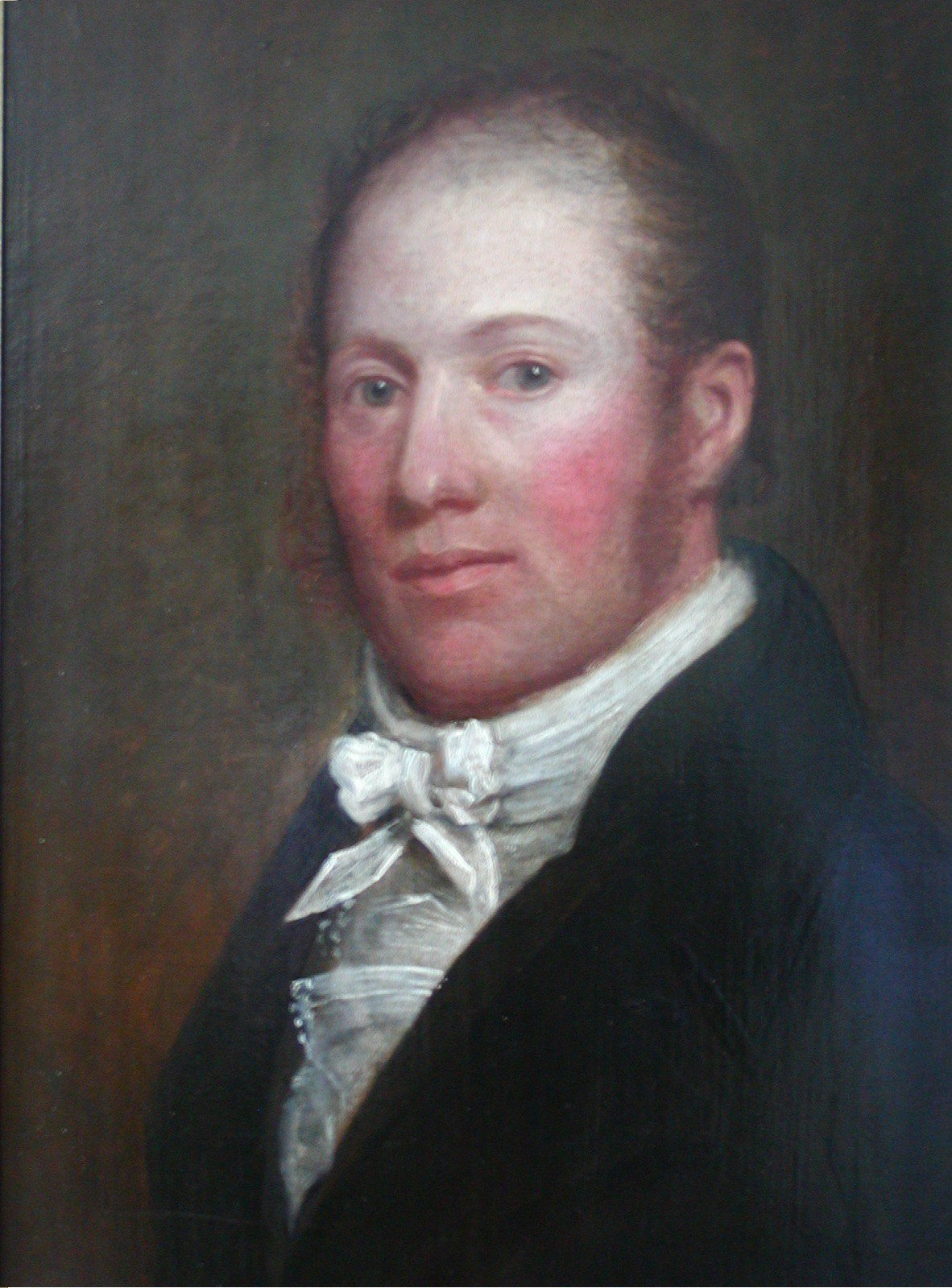
William Badger, c. 1805

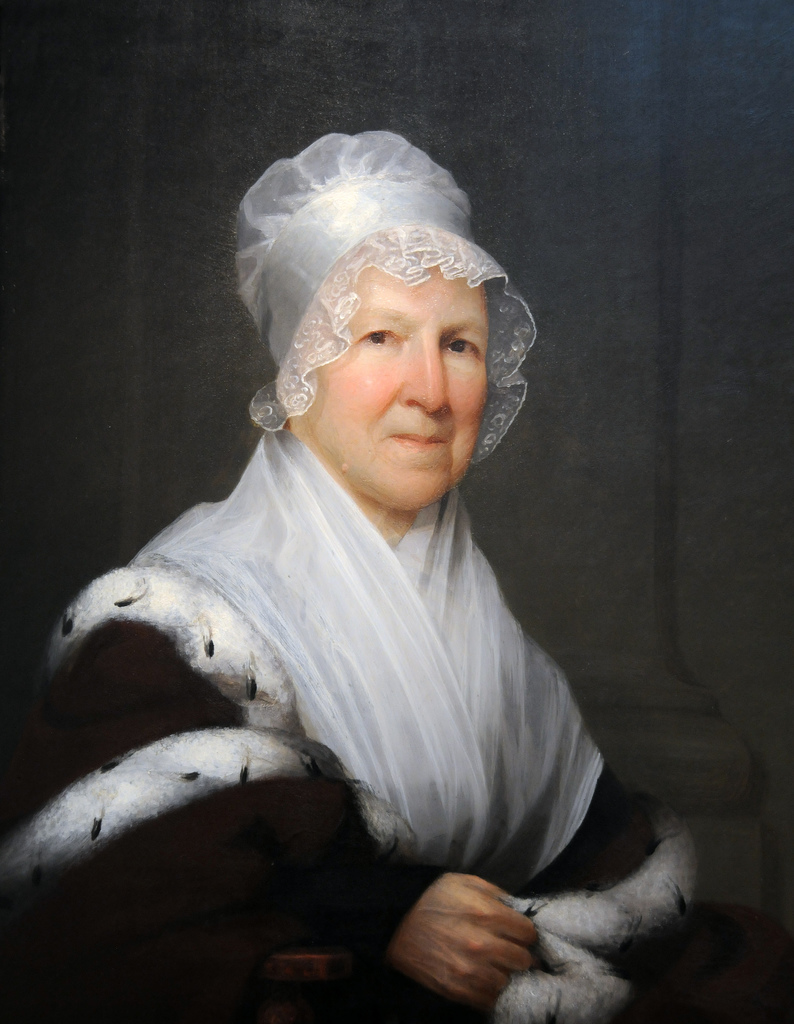
Lucia Pickering, 1820

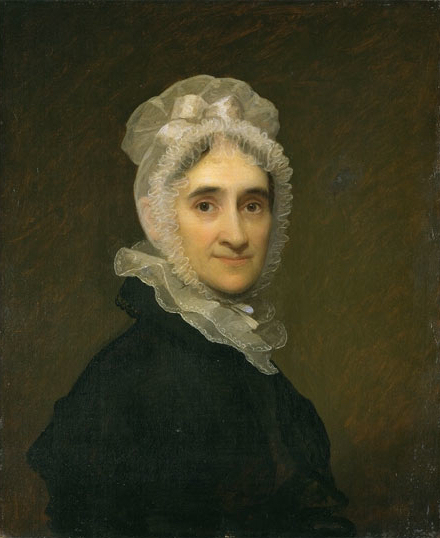
Elizabeth Brooks, 1823

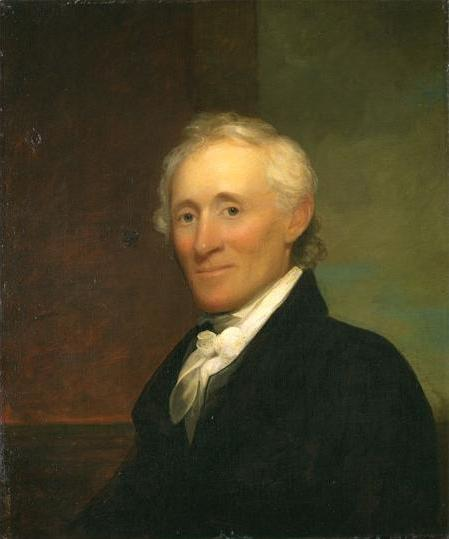
Jonathan Brooks, 1823

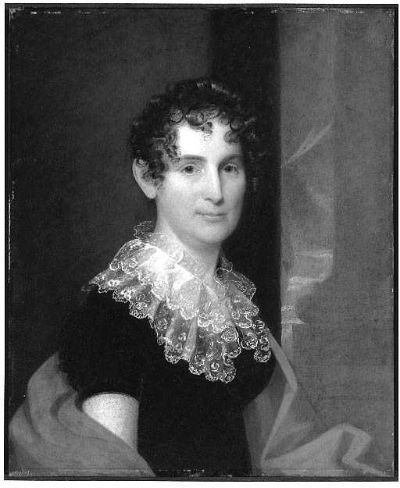
Mrs. Peter Gilman Robbins, c.1818

== See also ==
- Francis Alexander, an American painter who moved to Boston
- John Burgum, an ornamental painter and one of Frothingham's co-workers
- John Coles, a portrait and heraldic painter and Frothingham friend who also studied under Gilbert Stuart
