= Mary Seymour =

English noblewoman

- Born: 30 August 1548; Sudeley Castle, Gloucestershire, England
- Died: Late 1550? (purportedly aged ~2)
- Noble family: Seymour
- Father: Thomas Seymour, 1st Baron Seymour of Sudeley
- Mother: Catherine Parr

Mary Seymour (born 30 August 1548, date of death unknown) was the only daughter of Thomas Seymour, 1st Baron Seymour of Sudeley (brother of Jane Seymour, third wife of Henry VIII), and the dowager queen, Catherine Parr, widow of Henry VIII. Although Catherine was married four times, Mary was her only child, born at her father's country seat, Sudeley Castle in Gloucestershire. Complications from Mary's birth would claim the life of her mother on 5 September 1548, and her father was executed less than a year later for treason against her cousin Edward VI.

Restitution of Mary Seymour Act 1549
- Act of Parliament
- Parliament of England
- Long title: An Act of the Restitution of Mary Seymour dawghter of the Lorde Seymour late Admirall of Englond.
- Citation: 3 & 4 Edw. 6. c. 14
- Territorial extent: England and Wales

Dates
- Royal assent: 1 February 1550
- Commencement: 4 November 1549 (Note: Start of session.)
- Repealed: 16 June 1977
Other legislation
Repealed by	Statute Law (Repeals) Act 1977

Status: Repealed

Text of statute as originally enacted

In 1549, the Parliament of England passed the Restitution of Mary Seymour Act 1549 (3 & 4 Edw. 6. c. 14) removing the attainder placed on her father from Mary, but retaining Thomas' lands as property of the Crown.

As her mother's wealth was left entirely to her father and later confiscated by the Crown, Mary was left a destitute orphan in the care of Katherine Willoughby, Duchess of Suffolk, who appears to have resented this imposition. After her second birthday in 1550, Mary disappears from historical record completely, and no claim was ever made on her father's meagre estate, leading to the conclusion that she did not live past the age of two.

== Survival speculations ==
Victorian author Agnes Strickland claimed, in her biography of Catherine Parr, that Mary Seymour did survive to adulthood, and, in fact, married Sir Edward Bushel, a member of the household of Anne of Denmark, wife of James VI and I. Strickland's theory suggested that the Dowager Duchess of Suffolk, after her marriage to Richard Bertie in 1553, and before she fled England during the Marian Persecutions in or after 1555, arranged Mary's marriage to Bushel. The problem with this theory is that Mary would have been aged only six at the time.

A more modern theory, from Linda Porter, author of a 2010 biography on Katherine Parr, suggests that a 1573 Latin book of poems and epitaphs written by John Parkhurst, Katherine Parr's chaplain, contains the following reference to Mary:

I whom at the cost
Of her own life
My queenly mother
Bore with the pangs of labour
Sleep under this marble
An unfit traveller.

If Death had given me to live longer
That virtue, that modesty, That obedience of my excellent Mother
That Heavenly courageous nature
Would have lived again in me.

Now, whoever
You are, fare thee well
Because I cannot speak any more, this stone
Is a memorial to my brief life.

Porter suggested that this was an epitaph written by Parkhurst, on the occasion of Mary's death around the age of two. Porter further speculates that Mary is buried in Lincolnshire, near Grimsthorpe, the estate owned by the Duchess of Suffolk, "where she had lived as an unwelcome burden for most of her short, sad life."

== Portrayals in fiction ==
The 2007 novel The Red Queen's Daughter by Jacqueline Kolosov speculates an alternative history where Mary Seymour becomes lady-in-waiting to Queen Elizabeth I. The 2009 novel The Stolen One by Suzanne Crowley depicts Mary being raised by a 'witch' in the English countryside. A similar premise allows Seymour's supernatural powers to help her friend Alison Bannister search for her lost child in the 2016 novel The Phantom Tree by Nicola Cornick.

The 2022 drama series Becoming Elizabeth portrays Mary’s birth.
