= Sarah C. Frothingham =

American miniature painter (1821–1861)

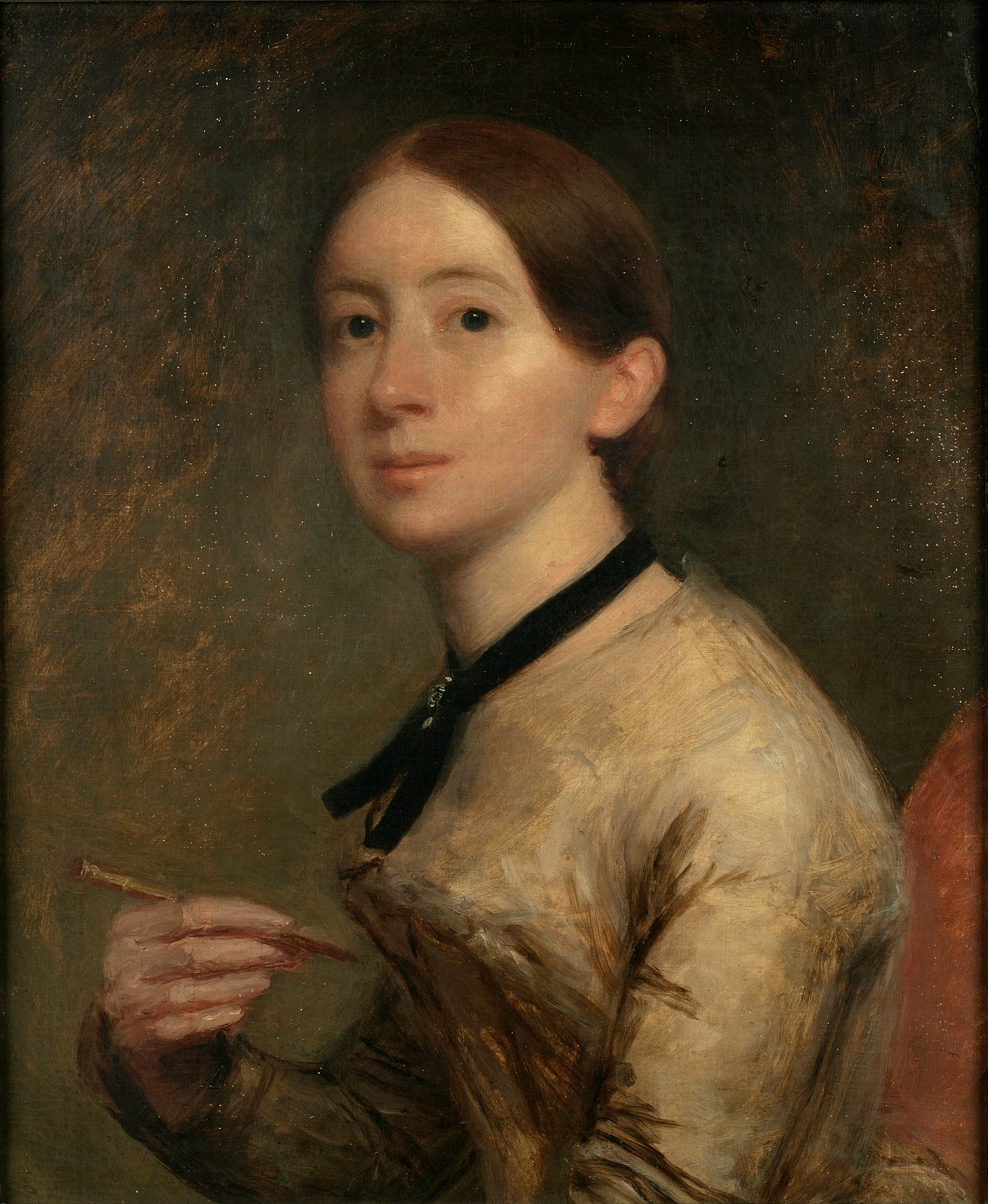
Portrait of Frothingham by James Frothingham

Sarah Carter Frothingham (1821 – July 20, 1861) was an American miniature painter.

== Biography ==
Frothingham was born in 1821, in Salem, Massachusetts. Her father was painter James Frothingham, who also mentored her.

In 1837, at age 16, Frothingham first exhibited her paintings at the National Academy of Design. Between 1837 and 1845, she did most of her paintings in New York. She also showed her miniature paintings at the exhibitions held in the Boston Athenaeum, the Boston Artists' Association, and the Brooklyn (New York) Institute.

In 1841, Frothingham was elected as an associate of the National Academy of Design. However, her membership was forfeited for not presenting a portrait of herself within one year of election as per the by-laws of the academy. In 1846, on her second election, a portrait of her painted by her father secured her place at the academy.

Frothingham died on July 20, 1861, aged 39 or 40, in New York City.
