= Louie Burrell =

English painter

Louisa Harriet "Louie" Burrell (née Luker 1873 – 1971) was an English-born artist who also lived in Canada and the United States.

== Biography ==
The daughter of William and Ada Luker, both artists, Burrell was born in London and studied at the South Kensington Art School. Her parents put her to work as an art teacher before she had completed her training there. She earned a scholarship to the Bushey School of Art, where she studied with Hubert von Herkomer. Some of her miniatures were accepted for display at the Royal Academy of Arts. She left England for Cape Town where she married Philip Burrell. Burell returned to England for the birth of her daughter; unfortunately, her husband suffered a heart attack while boarding a ship to rejoin them.

In 1912, Burrell became a member of the Royal Miniature Society. She returned to Ottawa in 1912, where she painted members of Ottawa society. Unable to return to England due to World War I, she moved to Victoria where she operated a boarding house for a time. From 1916 to 1919, she lived in Hollywood, where she painted portraits of film stars.

She returned to England and established a studio in Knightbridge where she painted two watercolour portraits a day at five guineas each. An early customer was Lucy Baldwin who was the Prime Minister's wife and she became a friend. She enjoyed good custom for some years but she found the task difficult. She met E.G.John Moore who was divorced, he had been a civil servant and was once the vicar of Amblecote. Burrell married Moore in 1922; the second marriage lasted six months.

With Lucy Balwin's patronage she started to create larger portraits in oil paints. Commissions from Lucy for paintings of herself and a daughter and another of her grandson in addition to water colours of the interiors of 10 Downing Street were part of her work.

She moved to India in 1929 and painted members of the royalty there. In 1931, she returned to London with a six-month stopover in Cairo. Burrell was awarded a grant by the artists' general benevolent fund for her support in 1952.

She died in London in 1971. Her daughter, Philippa Burrell, wrote an autobiography, The Golden Thread, which contains accounts of her experiences with her mother.

Her work is included in the collections of the Victoria and Albert Museum, the Bushey Museum, the University of Hull Art Collection, the Djanogly Art Gallery at the University of Nottingham, the Ashmolean Museum, the Herkomer Museum, Landsberg am Lech in Bavaria and the National Gallery of Canada. In 1979, the National Book League in London exhibited her work.
