= Edward Greene Malbone =

American painter

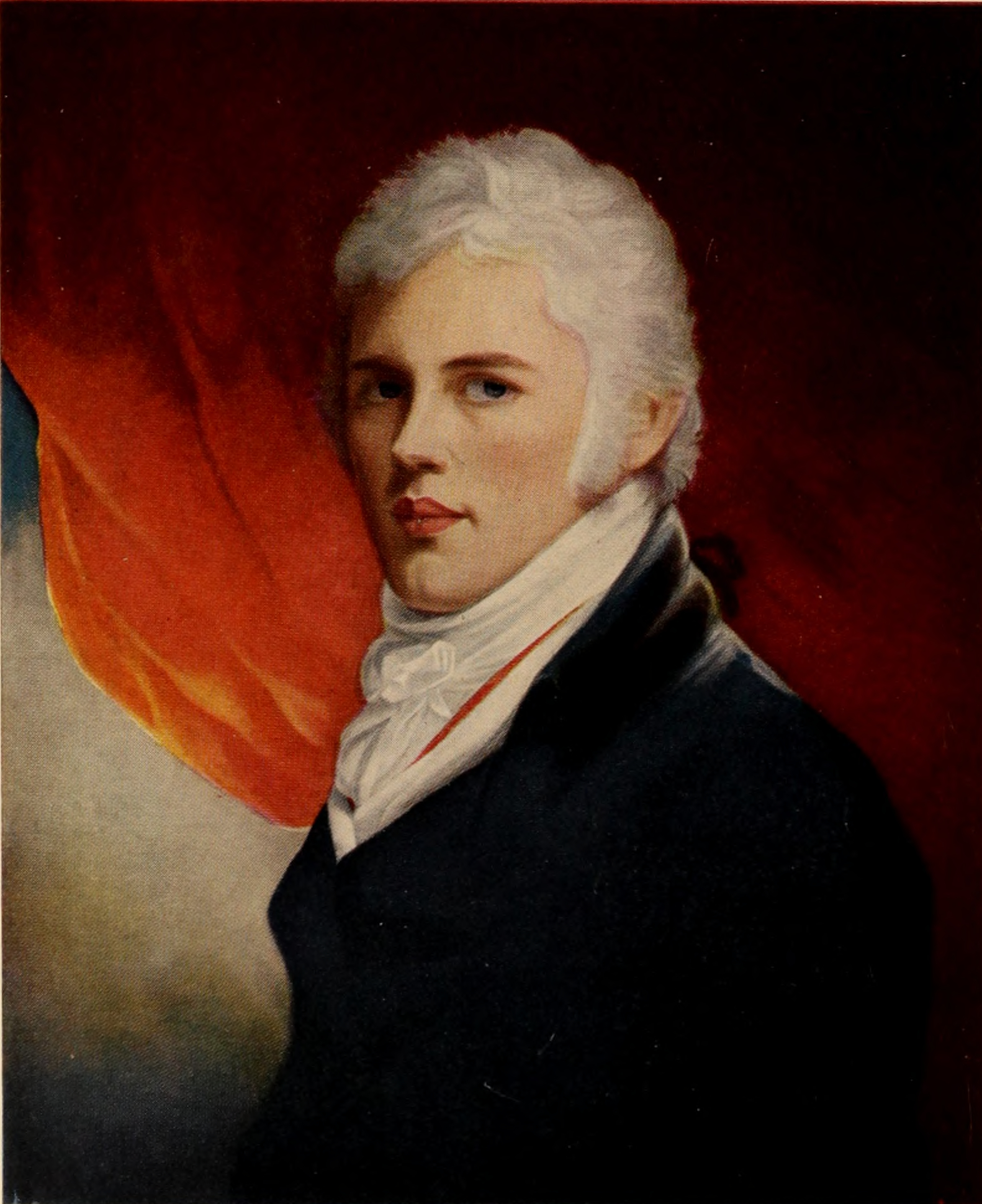
- Self portrait, c. 1798
- Born: 1777; Newport, Rhode Island
- Died: May 7, 1807 (aged 29–30); Savannah, Georgia

Edward Greene Malbone (1777 – May 7, 1807) was an American painter and the most sought-after miniaturist of his day in the United States. He was an influence on other artists including Charles Fraser, William Dunlap and John Wesley Jarvis. Malbone was born at Newport, Rhode Island and began his career in Providence, Rhode Island at the age of 17, later working in Boston, New York City, Philadelphia, Charleston and London. Exacting and unceasing work undermined his constitution and following an attempt to recover his health in Jamaica, he came to Savannah and died there of tuberculosis at the home of his cousin, Robert Mackay, on May 7, 1807. He is buried in Savannah's Colonial Park Cemetery.
