= Joanna Quiner =

American seamstress and sculptor (1796–1868)

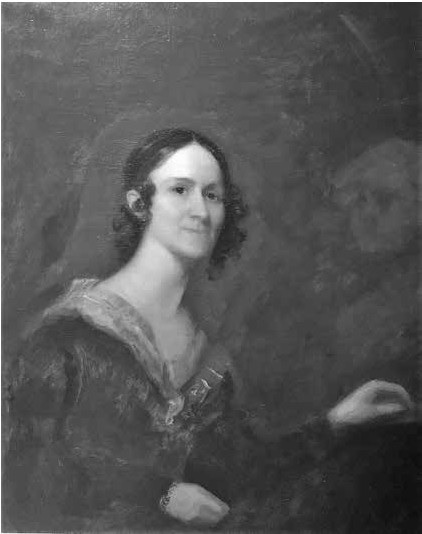
Portrait of Quiner by James Frothingham

Joanna Quiner (August 27, 1796 – September 20, 1868) was an American seamstress and self-taught sculptor.

== Early life ==
Quiner was born in Beverly, Massachusetts, the daughter of Abraham Quiner, Jr. and Susannah Camell.

== Career ==
External image
- Sculpture of Robert Rantoul at the Boston Athenæum

For much of her early life, Quiner worked as a seamstress in her hometown of Beverly and nearby Salem; she did some upholstery for the family of Theodore Parker, and came to admire Parker's views. In 1838, she took a position in the household of Seth Bass, the librarian at the Boston Athenæum. She lived in the Athenaeum building with the Bass family; sculptor Shobal Vail Clevenger kept studio space there, and she observed him at work. She borrowed some of Clevenger's clay and crafted a likeness of Seth Bass that was of such quality that he encouraged her to continue her art. She was forty-two at the time. Quiner exhibited work at the Athenaeum in 1846–48, and in 1847 worked there briefly as a gallery attendant in the Orpheus Room, but ill health combined with financial pressures caused her to give up sculpting and return to sewing in her last years.

Quiner worked exclusively in plaster during her career. Her best-known work is a portrait of Robert Rantoul, cast in plaster and presented to the Athenaeum in 1842; it was the first sculpture by a woman to be shown there when it was exhibited in 1846. She also crafted portrait busts of Fitch Poole, Alonzo Lewis, and James Frothingham, whose own portrait of the sculptor is held by the Beverly Public Library in Beverly, Massachusetts.

The Beverly Historical Society collection includes portrait busts of Quiner's father and of Phebe Ann Coffin Hanaford, a good friend. Hanaford wrote a biographical sketch of Quiner, and also penned two sonnets inspired by her and her work.

== Death ==
Quiner died either at her sister's residence in Lynn or in her hometown of Beverly, and is buried in the Central Cemetery in Beverly. A laudatory notice appeared in the Beverly Citizen around the time of her death.
