= Jacques Daliwe =

Franco-Flemish painter

Jacques Daliwe was a Franco-Flemish painter active between 1380 and 1416. His only known work is a book of drawings on wood, now kept in the Berlin State Library, with studies of facial expressions and some more complete Biblical scenes (including an Annunciation, a Crowning of Mary, and a Sorrows of Christ). He is supposed to have worked at the court of the Duke of Berry, and some of his drawings reuse compositions by the Limbourg brothers. However, while the figures are depicted almost exactly in detail as in the original works, the style in Daliwe's miniatures is completely different: while the Limbourgs depict elegant, refined persons without authentic emotions, Daliwe's rendition is full of life and movement and the facial features are highly personalized.
