= Alonzo Lewis =

American journalist

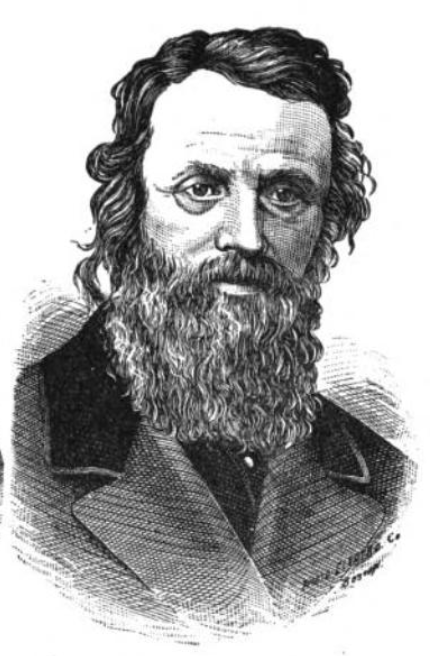
Alonzo Lewis (1794–1861)

Alonzo Lewis (1794–1861) was a teacher, writer, surveyor, poet, reporter, editor, engineer, and publisher of Lynn, Massachusetts. He was an ardent abolitionist and edited the Lynn Weekly Mirror, the Lynn Record (in 1830), and Freedom's Amulet. He created the 1829 Map of Lynn on order of the Lynn selectmen and Massachusetts Legislature. In 1838, he created a survey of Lynn Beach and Harbor for the US Congress.

He was born August 28, 1794, son of Zachariah and Mary (Hudson) Lewis, and grandson of Nathan and Mary (Newhall) Lewis. His siblings were Irene (born June 10, 1797), Mary (born October 18, 1802), and Henry (born November 3, 1807).

Alonzo married Frances Maria Swan on January 7, 1822. They had six children: Alonzo (born November 30, 1822); Frances Maria (born October 17, 1824); Aurelius (born March 12, 1827); Lewellyn (born April 29, 1829); Arthur Lynnworth (born September 2, 1831); and Thomas (died January 26, 1839). Frances died May 27, 1839, at age 36.

He published three books of poetry between 1824 and 1834, and his collected poems were published posthumously in 1883.

He wrote and published The Picture of Nahant, printed by J. B. Tolman in 1845. He also wrote and published A Guide through Nahant with an account of its earliest inhabitants printed in 1851.

His History of Lynn was first published in 1829, printed by J. H. Eastburn in Boston with 260 pages. The second updated version was published in 1844, printed by Samuel N. Dickinson with 276 pages. This 1844 book identifies him as "The Lynn Bard." James R. Newhall created an updated version in 1865, published by John L. Shorey with 620 pages. This was republished in 1890 by George C. Herbert.

Lewis was the subject of a portrait bust by Joanna Quiner.
