= Chosen Hill, Gloucestershire =

Hill in Gloucestershire, England

Chosen Hill
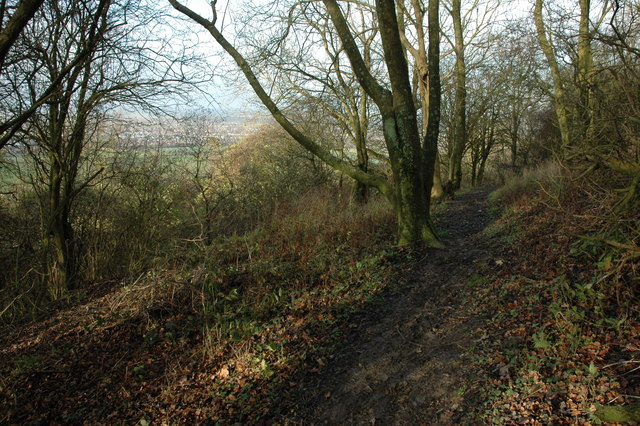
- Footpath on Chosen Hill, Churchdown

- Location within Gloucestershire
- Interactive map of Chosen Hill
- Type: Gloucestershire Wildlife Trust nature reserve
- Location: between Gloucester and Cheltenham
- Coordinates: 51°52′1.93″N 2°10′19.39″W
- Area: 28.5 acres (11.5 ha)
- Created: 1990
- Operator: Gloucestershire Wildlife Trust Severn Trent plc
- Status: Open all year

Chosen Hill (grid reference SO882187) (or Churchdown Hill) rises above Churchdown in Gloucestershire, England, and is the site of a 11.5-hectare (28-acre) nature reserve.

The hill commands good views over the scarp and the Severn Vale and there is a network of paths for walkers. One such path is 'coffin way' from St Bartholomew's Church at the top of the hill towards Hucclecote.

== Etymology ==
The word Chosen is a contraction, first attested in 1577 as Churson, of the name Churchdown. The name Churchdown itself contains the Old English word dūn ("hill"), and so presumably originally referred to the hill itself, but as the name came to refer to the settlement associated with the hill, and its etymological meaning became opaque, the word hill was added to distinguish the hill from the settlement.

== Archaeology ==
There is an archaeological site - an Iron Age fort known as Churchdown Hill Camp - below the main reservoir.

== Geology ==
Geologically, it is on one of outliers of the Cotswold scarp.

== Water Reservoirs ==
Covered reservoirs were constructed on the Hill in the late 1930's. In 1936 Cheltenham and Gloucester Corporations were successful in obtaining a new water supply act creating the Cheltenham and Gloucester Joint Water Board, which took responsibility for water services from the two councils. The Act also included powers to improve water supply by extending the Tewkesbury waterworks and create two covered reservoirs on Churchdown Hill, capable of storing 6 million gallons. The reserviors were supplied by a new 9 mile pumping main from Tewkesbury.

There were complaints about how the landscape of the reservoirs were maintained in 1949.

On 1 April 1965 the Cheltenham and Gloucester Joint Water Board was replaced by the North West Gloucestershire Water Board, who were in turn replaced by Severn Trent Water Authority on 1 April 1974.

== Nature reserves ==
The Hill is encircled by four nature reserves, considered and managed as one reserve, by the Woodland Trust under agreement with Severn Trent plc since 1990.

=== Trees ===
The largest conifers were planted some 120 years ago. Recent planting dates from the 1940s. The large trees include Scots pine, Austrian pine and coast redwood. The more recent plantings include larch and pine.

The ancient woodland area includes oak, ash, hazel and field maple. Also growing are hawthorn, blackthorn, crab apple, wild cherry and holly.

Gorse and ash grow in the grassland.

=== Plants ===
The reserve is known for its spring flowering of bluebell, together with archangel, wood anemone and dog-violet.

The grassland area is now unimproved and cowslip, tormentil, cuckooflower and bird's-foot-trefoil flourish. The bee orchid has also been recorded.

There is a limestone-loving range of plants at the top of the slope which include common milkwort, field scabious, yellow-wort and hairy violet.

=== Birds ===
Breeding birds recorded are chiffchaff, little owl, great spotted woodpecker, linnet, nuthatch, yellowhammer and whitethroat. There is a ride to the north of the reserve where woodcock have been seen.

=== Conservation ===
Over the years, there has been felling of some of the conifers and dense areas of cherry laurel. Replanting done is with broad-leaved species. Coppicing of the hazel has taken place as well as other scrub clearance. Grazing was reintroduced in 1991 after a gap of some five years.

== Cultural influence ==
Chosen Hill was a favourite haunt of the early twentieth-century composers Ivor Gurney and Herbert Howells - it was the direct inspiration for Howells' Piano Quartet in A minor and his 'Chosen Tune' (the latter dedicated to his fiancée who lived at Churchdown).

Gerald Finzi spent New Year's Eve 1925 at the Sexton's Cottage by the church, and the ringing in of the new year inspired two works - the orchestral Nocturne (New Year Music) (1926) and his choral work In Terra Pax (1954). Showing Ralph Vaughan Williams the hill in 1956, Finzi visited the cottage, but caught chickenpox from children living there. Already dying from Hodgkin's lymphoma, the illness brought about Finzi's death two weeks later.

In 2010, the BBC reported that Willard Wigan, famed for his microscopic art, had sculpted a model of Chosen Hill's St Bartholomew's church on a grain of sand that he had taken from its churchyard. He had done so in response to a challenge from his girlfriend, who described the result as "absolutely fantastic". Despite positive feedback, Wigan expressed dissatisfaction with the work, saying "As small as what you've seen, it's not the best of me yet, I'm taking it even smaller because I'm not satisfied with my work right now, it's too big."

== Residents ==
Although the hill is primarily a nature and recreation area, it is not free of residentsː the residential area of the village of Churchdown stretches with a so-called better residential area on the northern slope in the course of the access road to the summit up to about 95 meters above sea level . Chosen Hill Cottage, an inhabited house, is located on the summit plateau itself, about 50 meters east of the summit. To the west and south are a few houses, the so-called Oystershell Cottages (Buscombe Noake) up to an altitude of 95 meters above sea level; one of these cottages was in earlier times a "tea garden" and a favorite meeting place for the residents of Churchdown and Hucclecotes.

== Publications ==
- Kelham, A, Sanderson, J, Doe, J, Edgeley-Smith, M, et al., 1979, 1990, 2002 editions, 'Nature Reserves of the Gloucestershire Trust for Nature Conservation/Gloucestershire Wildlife Trust'
- 'Nature Reserve Guide – discover the wild Gloucestershire on your doorstep' – 50th Anniversary, January 2011, Gloucestershire Wildlife Trust
