= Willard Wigan =

British sculptor (born 1957)

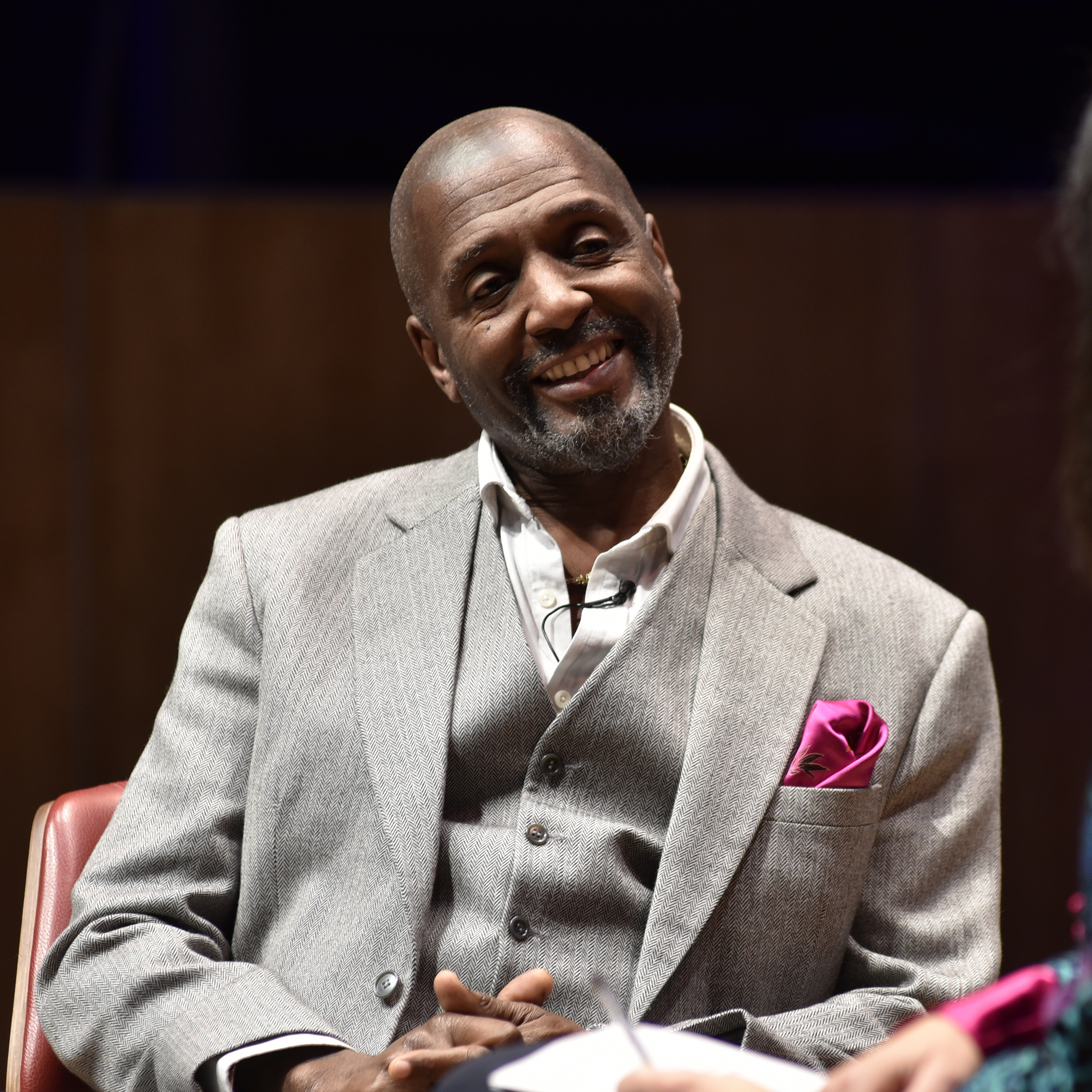
- Wigan in 2019
- Born: June 1957 (age 68–69); Ashmore Park Estate, Wednesfield, England
- Known for: Sculpture
- Movement: Micro miniature
- Awards: MBE

Willard Wigan, MBE (born June 1957) is a British sculptor from Ashmore Park Estate, Wednesfield, England, the son of Jamaican immigrants, who makes micro miniature sculptures. His sculptures are typically placed in the eye of a needle or on the head of a pin. A single sculpture can be as small as 0.005 mm (0.0002 in).

== Life and work ==
As a child with dyslexia and ASD, neither of which was diagnosed until adulthood, Wigan was ridiculed in class by his primary school teachers for not learning to read. Wigan attributes his early drive in sculpting, which began at the age of five, to his need to escape from the derision of teachers and classmates. He wanted to show the world that nothing did not exist, deducing that if people were unable to view his work, then they would not be in any position to criticise it. Wigan has since aimed to make even smaller artworks, visible only with a microscope.

In July 2007, he was made an MBE.

On 3 February 2016, Wigan was a guest on BBC Radio 4's Midweek programme.

On 5 September 2017, Wigan's was recognized by Guinness World Records as having created the smallest handmade sculpture in the world; it measured 0.078 by 0.053 millimetres and depicted a human foetus. This record beat his prior record set in 2013 when he made a 24-carat gold motorbike embedded into a human hair.

In January 2018, Wigan received an honorary doctorate from the University of Warwick in recognition of the significant contributions that he has made to art and sculpture.

== Exhibitions and American tour ==
In 2004, Wigan exhibited at The Artlounge gallery in Birmingham. The BBC's Inside Out – South West noted that the works displayed included "scenes of Jesus Christ and The Last Supper, with each individual figure no bigger than an eyelash or a human hair. At less than a hundredth of an inch tall, it's painstakingly precise work".

In 2009, Wigan appeared as a guest speaker at the TED Conference in Oxford, UK. and later that year also as a guest on The Tonight Show with Conan O'Brien in the US.

After a series of exhibitions in the UK, during 2009 and 2010 Wigan toured the US.

On 6 November 2012, election night in America, he was a guest on the television show Conan on TBS.

Wigan marked the Diamond Jubilee of Elizabeth II by sculpting the Queen's portrait on a coffee bean; he described creating the work as "a bit of a challenge because a coffee bean crumbles and is hollow in the middle".

The Library of Birmingham exhibited his works in January 2015. In 2010, the BBC reported that Wigan had sculpted a model of St Bartholomew's church in Chosen Hill, Gloucestershire, on a grain of sand that he had taken from its churchyard. He had done so in response to a challenge from his girlfriend, who described the result as "absolutely fantastic". The vicar of the church said the sculpture was beautiful, but Wigan expressed his own dissatisfaction with the work, saying: "As small as what you've seen, it's not the best of me yet, I'm taking it even smaller because I'm not satisfied with my work right now; it's too big."

In 2022, Willard was a judge on the show The Great Big Tiny Design Challenge, in which competitors created miniature furniture.

In 2026, Willard continues to create micro sculptures including a recent work of an alien and a stag's head that was inspired by a scene in Stephen Spielberg's new movie 'Disclosure Day'
