= Suzanne Crowley =

American children's book author

- Born: Suzanne Carlisle Crowley; November 19, 1963 (age 62); Uvalde, Texas, U.S.
- Education: Stratford High School; University of Texas at Austin
- Occupation: Author
- Writing career
- Genre: Children's literature
- Website: suzannecrowley.com

Suzanne Carlisle Crowley (born November 19, 1963) is an American children's book author whose books target a young adolescent audience. She is the published author of The Very Ordered Existence of Merilee Marvelous and The Stolen One. Her debut novel, The Very Ordered Existence of Merilee Marvelous was an IRA Notable Children's Book, and was selected as the Book Sense #3 Top Children's Pick for Fall of 2007. The Stolen One, her second novel, is an Indie Next List Pick for Fall of 2009 and a Best Books for Young Adults nominee.

== Early life ==
Suzanne Carlisle Crowley was born in the small town of Uvalde, Texas and spent her childhood in Austin and Houston. Her father, Acree Carlisle, was an architect, and her mother, Corinne Orr, was a teacher and homemaker. She has two sisters, Bonnie and Karen. Crowley graduated from Stratford High School in Houston, and attended the University of Texas at Austin, earning her Bachelor of Journalism degree in 1986 with a minor in English.

== Career ==
Crowley's literary career began at Austin Homes and Gardens magazine where she wrote and answered phones. Inspired by her grandmother Edith Carlisle, who kept a blue willow ginger jar filled with tiny treasures for Suzanne when she came to visit, Suzanne became enchanted with the delicate items her grandmother exposed her to. After discovering doll house shops in high-school and taking a few classes, she began making her own miniature room boxes. She is now a miniature artist whose work has been featured on the covers of American and international magazines. Her hobbies include making miniature sculptures and dollhouses, art collecting, playing piano, shopping, studying history, reading, and traveling. Her love for miniatures and doll houses developed into a home business, Crowley Interiors, where she produces sculpted miniatures and room boxes and sells them at shows across the country. Along with authoring The Very Ordered Existence of Merille Marvelous and The Stolen One, Crowley has authored a miniature book on the history of paisley fabrics.

The main character of Crowley's first published novel, The Very Ordered Existence of Merilee, has characteristics of Asperger's syndrome and lives in a small town in west Texas. With her "unique view of the world," she depends on her "very ordered existence," a rigid schedule that keeps her own track. This thirteen-year-old girl's orderly life is challenged when she meets Biswick, a new boy in town who is dealing with challenges of his own.

The Stolen One, Crowley's second book, is a historical fiction novel set in Elizabethan England. The Stolen One tells the story of a 16-year-old girl, Kat, who has grown up in modest circumstances under the care of her foster mother. After her foster mother's death, Kat travels to London searching for the identities of her biological parents. While in London, Kat is taken under the care of Queen Elizabeth I herself, and begins hearing talk of the queen being her true mother. Kat's personal journal entries, revealed throughout the book, allow the reader entry into Kat's mind, heart, and soul. The mystery of Kat's true identity is being discovered while Kat is distinguishing her own feelings of love and allegiance between the handsome boys at court and the farmer boy back home.

== Awards and honors ==
- The Very Ordered Existence of Merilee Marvelous: Book Sense Pick, 2007; IRA Notable Children’s Book, 2008; Georgia Children's Book Award Nominee, 2009; Texas State Reading Association Children's Literature Honor Book, 2008; Bank Street Children's Books of the Year, 2008; KLIATT: Best of the Year Editor's Choice, 2008; Writer's League of Texas Teddy Children's Book Award Finalist, 2008
- The Stolen One: Indie Next List Pick, 2009; Best Books for Young Adults Nominee, 2009

== Novels ==
- The Very Ordered Existence of Merilee Marvelous
- The Stolen One
