= Graham Short =

British micro-artist (born 1946)

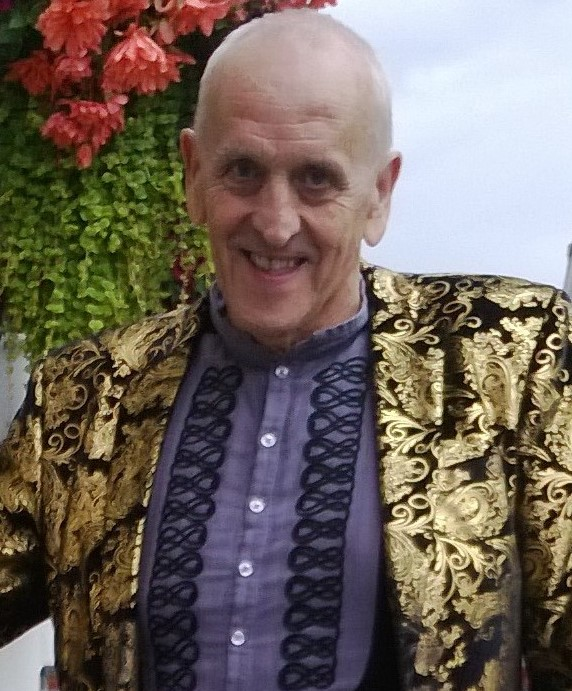
- Graham Short in 2017
- Born: Graham George Short; July 4, 1946 (age 79); Birmingham, England
- Known for: Micro-engraving

Graham George Short (born 4 July 1946) is a micro-artist and micro-engraving specialist from Birmingham, England.

== Early life and career ==
Graham Short was born on 4 July 1946 in Birmingham, England.

After leaving school with no qualifications at age 15, Short began a six-year apprenticeship at a stationery engraving company in Birmingham. There, he learned copper-plate and steel die engraving techniques, producing embossed letterheads, business cards, and wedding invitations for the stationery trade.

Following his apprenticeship, Short established a business in Birmingham's Jewellery Quarter, creating stationery for clients including banks, royal palaces, and perfume companies. In 1970, he began engraving the Lord's Prayer onto the head of a pin, a project he completed in 2010. The piece was later displayed at the Art Lounge Gallery in Birmingham's Mailbox shopping complex.

Short's first fine art exhibition was held in 2011 at the Art Decor Gallery in Whalley, Lancashire. Subsequent solo exhibitions were held at London's Clarendon Gallery and the Tony Huggins-Haig Galleries in Kelso.

In 2012, he spent nine months engraving the phrase "Nothing is Impossible" along the sharp edge of a Wilkinson Sword razor blade, a project he titled Cutting Edge. That same year, to mark Queen Elizabeth II's Diamond Jubilee, he created a microscopic portrait of the Queen on a gold speck inserted into the eye of a needle.

In 2019, the Institute of Cancer Research (ICR) commissioned him to collaborate with Poet Laureate Simon Armitage. Armitage's 51-word poem "Finishing It" was engraved onto a 20mm long x 10mm wide pill, which is permanently displayed at the ICR's Centre for Cancer Drug Discovery.

Short partnered with watchmaker Brax La Rue in 2020, engraving a microscopic design concealed within the mechanism of one of their timepieces.

In 2023, working with The Forces Network, he engraved the 405-letter World War I poem "In Flanders Fields" onto a fragment of metal scraped from his grandfather's Coldstream Guards cap badge, fitting the text within the eye of a needle.

In August 2024, Short collaborated with Chinese electronics company Honor to engrave a 166-word message—visible only under a microscope—on the side of the Magic V3 foldable phone, ahead of a global product launch in Germany. The text included a playful critique of competitor Samsung.

== Exhibitions ==
In November 2012, at 'The Writers Collection' at Clarendon Fine Art Gallery, Mayfair, London, Short unveiled 'Fry's Delight', a piece created in collaboration with TV Personality Stephen Fry. This piece was later sold at Sotheby's in London to raise funds for English PEN, a charity that supports imprisoned writers around the world.

In October 2014, the 'Love, Life and Hope Exhibition' was held at Platinum Galleries Northallerton. This included a viewing of 'In Flanders Fields', the First World War poem written by Lieutenant-Colonel John McCrae.

In 2021, 'The Tiniest Art in Town' exhibition opened at the Soden Collection in Shrewsbury.

As of July 2024, Graham Short's microscopic portrait of William Shakespeare is on permanent display at the Shakespeare Centre in Stratford on Avon. The portrait is engraved on a gold disc inside the eye of a needle.

== Religious pieces ==
From 2011 to 2013, Short created 'Five Pillars of Islam', a collection of nine calligraphic pieces fusing English and Arabic. The collection was displayed in Birmingham Central Mosque.

In June 2013, Short was invited by Indian artist Nikki Anand to introduce her 'Euphoria' solo exhibition to the British public for the first time at the Nehru Centre, London.

In June 2015, after four months of work, Short completed the engraving of the Khanda, on the point of a needle.

In August 2017, the 'Faith Exhibition' was shown in Kelso, Scotland, before touring Britain. Miniature engravings representing Sikh, Islamic, Hindu, and Christian religions were displayed. 'Otche Nash', the main prayer of the Russian Orthodox Church - engraved on the head of a gold pin measuring 2mm across, was shown to the public for the first time.

In April 2019, the '99 names of Allah' were engraved on the head of a gold pin measuring 2mm across. All 99 names are taken from verses of the Quran to describe Allah's attributes. This was a four-month project.

In 2022, Short engraved a nativity scene in the eye of a needle. This was exhibited at a Nativity Festival at St Laurence Church, Northfield, Birmingham.

In January 2023, he completed The Lord's Prayer, engraved on a speck of gold and inserted into the eye of a needle.

== Jane Austen £5 note Giveaway ==
In December 2016, Short engraved a portrait of Jane Austen on the transparent section of four polymer banknotes. Quotes from Emma, Pride and Prejudice, and Mansfield Park were also engraved onto the notes, encircling Jane's portrait. These were then put into circulation. The four notes were distributed across areas of Scotland, England, Wales, and Northern Ireland.

The £5 note, found in Northern Ireland, was sent anonymously to the Tony Huggins-Haig gallery in Kelso by the finder, who asked that the note be given to a children's charity. It was auctioned in London in December 2017 for £5,000. The proceeds were donated to the BBC Children in Need charity. The auctioneers Morton and Eden, waived their fees and donated their portion to the same charity.

== Other ventures ==
=== Swimming ===
In 2001, Short won the 200-meter butterfly at the European Masters Championships in Mallorca. He broke the British and European record in the 1500m Freestyle in the first session of the ASA National Masters Championships 2016 at Ponds Forge, Sheffield, swimming 22:04.97 to claim gold in the 70–74 years age group, nearly four seconds under the previous record time of 22:08.91.

=== Acting ===
In 2019, Short played Ned in the short film Ned & Me. The film, sponsored by the British Film Industry, was screened at the 2020 'This Is England Festival' in Rouen, France, and was accepted for The Aesthetica Film Festival in York, a BAFTA Qualifying Festival for British short films. At the 2021 FICBUEU International Film Festival in Spain, Short was awarded 'Best Actor' for his portrayal of Ned in 'Ned & Me'.

In 2023, Graham Short's second film, Dog Run, written and directed by Lorna Nickson Brown, received an honorable mention for ‘Best European Short Film' at the Catania Gold Elephant Film Festival in Italy.
