= Gopal Prasad Sharma =

Indian artist (born 1964)

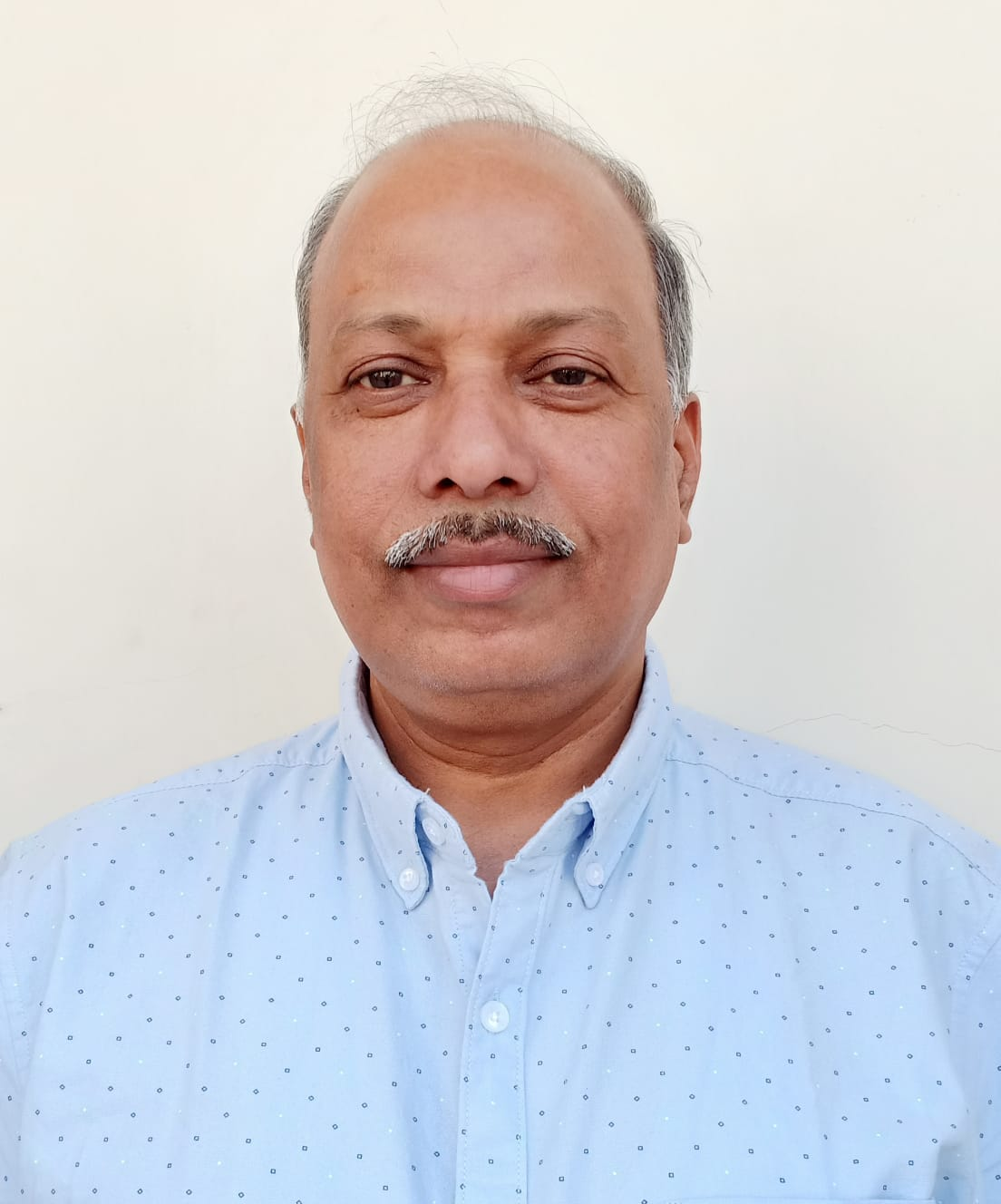
- Born: 16 June 1964 (age 62); Bijolia, Rajasthan, India
- Known for: Miniature painting
- Awards: Shilp Guru (2018); National Handicrafts Award (2007)

Gopal Prasad Sharma is an internationally recognised Indian artist associated with the traditional miniature art of Rajasthan.

He received Shilp Guru award 2018 by vice president of India for educating more than 25,000 students worldwide and for making biggest Ram Darbar in Miniature work.

He received a National Award for Master Craftsman in 2007. National Handicrafts Award is an Indian Government award conferred to outstanding master craftspersons in recognition of their outstanding contribution towards development of crafts.

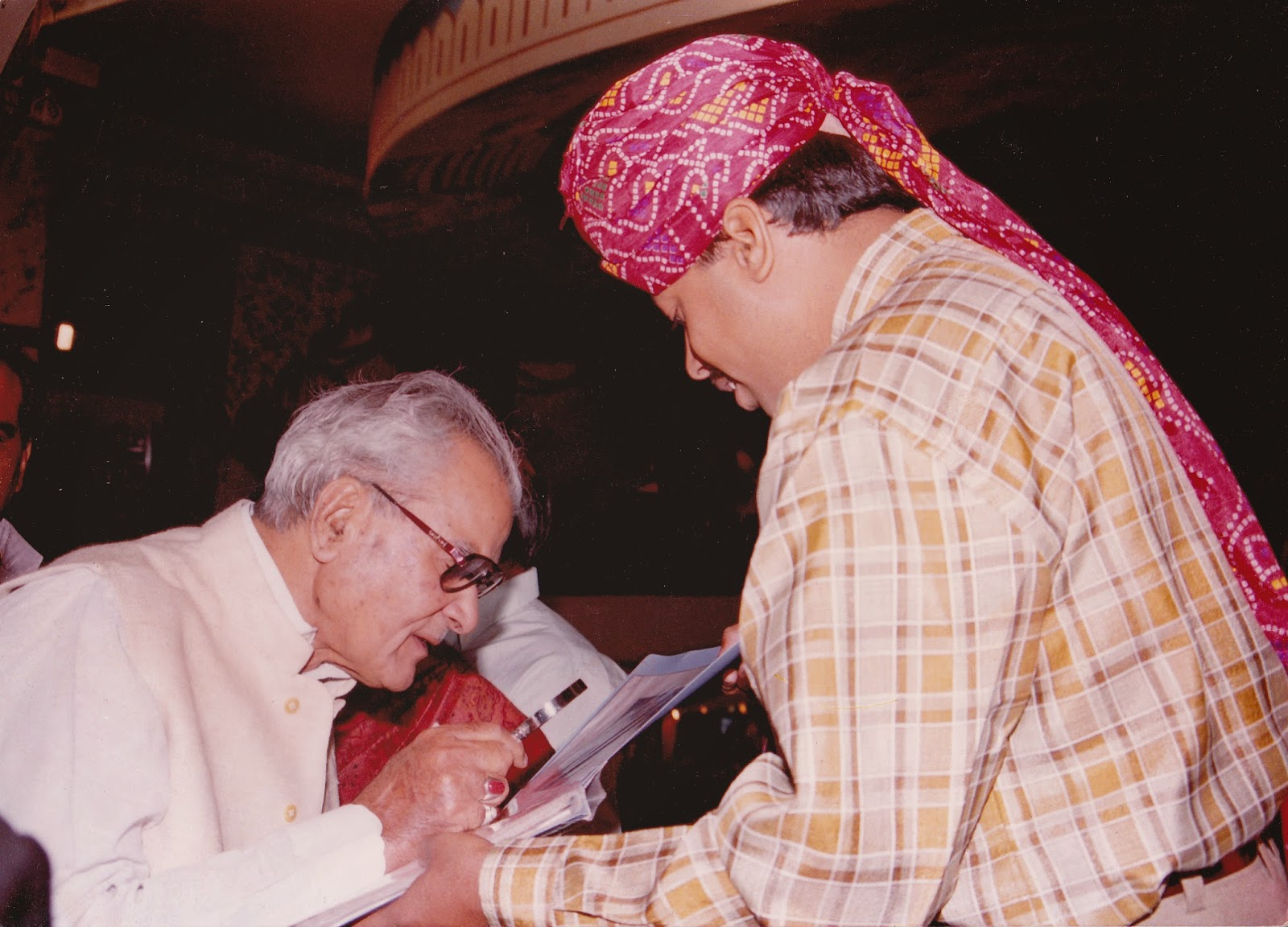
Gopal Prasad Sharma showing his artwork to former vice president of India, Bhairon Singh Shekhawat

His miniature paintings relate to Indian gods and the Mughal period, with intricate and delicate brushwork.He creates his colours from minerals, vegetables, precious stones, indigo, conch shells, and pure gold and silver.In 2003, the Nehru Centre, London recognized his artwork when he made a world-record smallest painting on a mustard seed.

He began teaching in 1989. He has taught approximately 25,000 students internationally, via school workshops and private lessons. he don't take any fee since he started teaching Miniature art, even sometimes he provide stay and food to the students who cant afford and come from other cities to learn . he has given 30 years of his life in teaching students and spreading traditional Miniature painting .

== Biography ==
Gopal Prasad Sharma was born in Bijolia, Rajasthan on 16 June 1964 . Where Mahatma Gandhi started Kisan Andolan. His Hindu family were artists to the royal family of Bijolia who called Rajmistri (Gardhars) at the time. His grand father late Devi Lal Shilpkar was a great artist and he fulfil the needs to thousands of artist families who work for royal family of Mewar. He also participated in freedom fight along with The great freedom fighter Manikya Lal Verma who was the first prime minister of Rajasthan and Vijay Singh Pathik. He was among the first Indian revolutionaries who lit the torch of freedom movement against British rule.

Gopal is the 8th generation continuing art work as the Legacy of the family, the art work his family was doing from generations is continuously spreading by his forefathers and developing the art form day by day. Gopal began as a wall painter in his village and he often traveled to different villages to paint walls with his father who was his guru (teacher). He painted on paper as a hobby and later adopted miniature painting as his profession.

Gopal began working as a professional artist in 1980. He made his name in the miniature art genre by working on handmade paper with natural colours. He created detailed paintings based on the culture and tradition of Rajasthan and the mughal theme, the oldest theme in Indian miniature. he always create his own theme and subjects to develop, spread and helps this drowning art form to learn by young generations. He keep teaching free of cost to the students who come over to learn. A few of the students from several universities has done PHD on Gopal.

He won the National Award which is given by the president of India and is the highest civilian award of India under the process of selecting the paintings by the jury assigned by the Handicrafts Department of India, DCH development commissioner handicrafts comes under ministry of textiles and handicrafts by government of India|Miniature painting=fine work done by single hair brush on hand made paper or cloth, for his research, artwork, and spreading the knowledge of traditional miniature. He became noted in the Indian miniature art world for portraits of famous people, such as Mahatma Gandhi, Mother Teresa, Shivaji, Maharana Pratap, Princess Diana, and Bill Clinton.

He has received various other awards and exhibited his artwork internationally.

His children, Abhisek Sharma and Neha Sharma, the 9th generation are both artists and working under the guidelines of their father. They have each won their own awards.

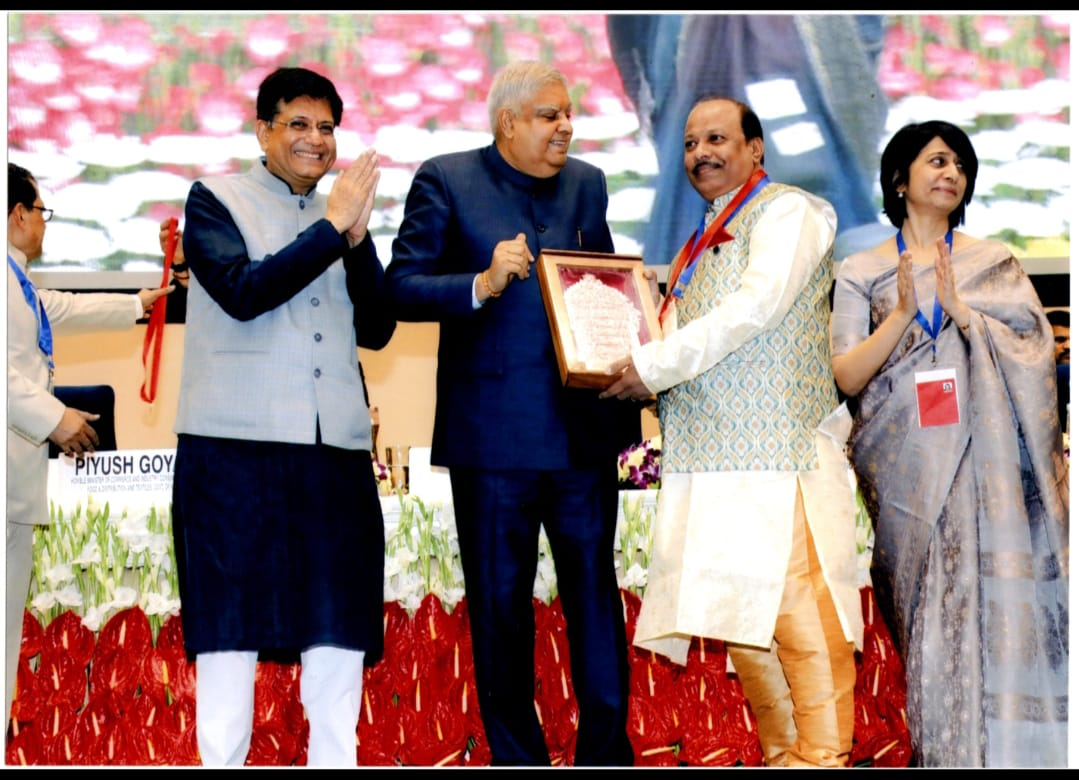
Gopal prasad sharma awarded by vice President of India Shri Jagdeep Dhankhar ji on 28 November 2022

Daughter Neha sharma won state award by government of rajasthan in the phad style painting which is folk art of rajasthan .
