= Miniature painting =

Miniature painting may refer to:

- Miniature (illuminated manuscript), a small illustration used to decorate an illuminated manuscript
  - Persian miniature, a small painting on paper in the Persian tradition, for a book or album
  - Ottoman miniature, a small painting on paper in the tradition of the Ottoman Empire, for a book or album
  - Mughal painting
  - Deccan painting
- Portrait miniature, a miniature portrait painting
- Miniature figure painting, the hobby of painting miniature figures

== See also ==
- Miniaturist (disambiguation)
