= Mallikarjuna Rao =

Mallikarjuna Rao may refer to:

- Grandhi Mallikarjuna Rao (born 1950), founder and chairman of GMR Group
- Kandula Mallikarjuna Rao (1921–1996), popular music composer and singer
- Mallikarjuna Rao (actor) (died 2008), popular Comedian in Telugu cinema
