= Museum of Miniatures in Prague =

Museum on Miniatures
- Muzeum miniatur
- Interactive fullscreen map
- Established: 1998; 28 years ago
- Location: Strahovské nádvoří 11, Prague 1, Czech Republic, 118 00
- Coordinates: 50°5′14.28″N 14°23′21.48″E
- Website: muzeumminiatur.cz

The Museum on Miniatures (Czech: Muzeum miniatur) is a museum in Prague. It features a number of miniature works of art, some of them needing to be viewed with a microscope or magnifying device.

== Background ==
The museum was previously based in Saint Petersburg in Russia, before moving to Prague in the 1990s. The museum is located close to Strahov Monastery and Library. The museum is managed by Ignat Kinol. There are a total of 29 exhibits in the museum.

The museum is based on the work of artist Anatoly Konenko from Siberia. He is a manufacturer of tools used for microsurgery, and uses similar tools to create microscopic art in his spare time. It is one of the largest collection of micro-miniatures in Europe. The art form was founded in the 1950s by the Armenian artist Edward Ter Ghazarian, and involves using microscopes to create artwork which is not able to be viewed with the naked eye. The genre of art became popular in Russia in the 1980s. One exhibit in the museum is a book which was awarded a Guinness World Record for being the world's smallest book, at just 0.9mm x 0.9mm. The book is a copy of The Chameleon by Anton Chekhov, with thirty pages and three illustrations. Other exhibits include ten camels carved in the eye of a needle, a carving of the Eiffel Tower which is 1/10 of an inch, and the Lord's Prayer written on a strand of hair. There are also copies of paintings by famous artists, including Salvador Dalí, Henri Matisse, Sandro Botticelli, Rembrandt van Rijn, and Leonardo da Vinci.
