= Elisabeth Barbara Schmetterling =

Dutch painter

Elisabeth Barbara Schmetterling (baptized 6 December 1801 (Note: From Klarenbeek: the Netherlands Institute for Art History (RKD) shows her date of birth as 30 November 1804)– 12 November 1882) was a Dutch artist.

== Life and career ==
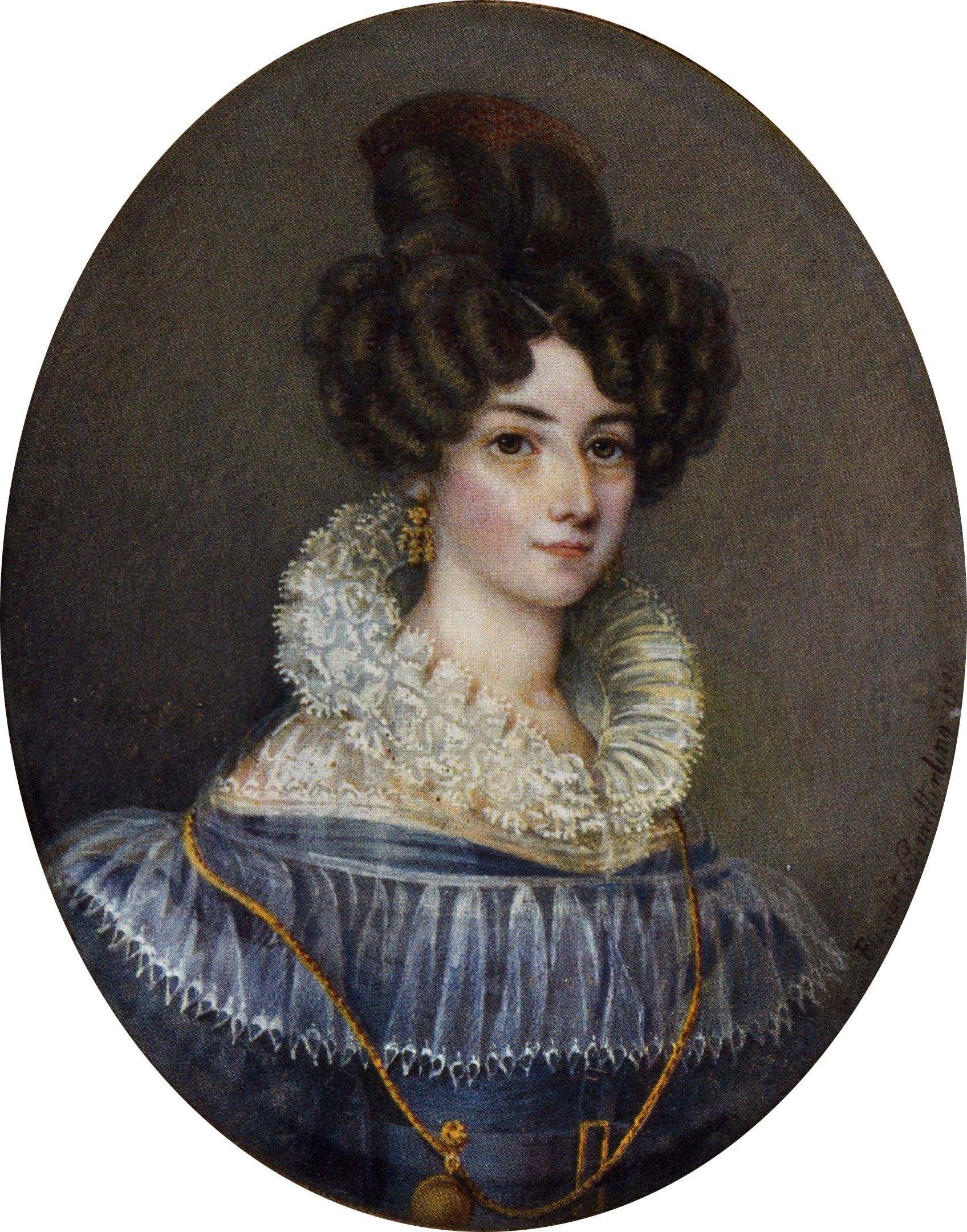
Miniature portrait of Johanna Catharina Adelaide Schuyt (1801-1869) by Elisabeth Barbara Schmetterling

The daughter of Antonia Blom and miniaturist Jozef Adolf Schmetterling, she was born in Amsterdam and grew up there. She was educated in art by her father. She first worked in printmaking, showing her prints at Tentoonstelling van Levende Meesters (Exhibitions by Living Masters). She also provided illustrations for children's books and the Nederlandsche Muzen-Almanak , an almanac. Around 1830, she began working on miniatures, doing portraits and copies of works by masters from the 17th century.

Schmetterling died in Amsterdam at the age of 80.

Her work is included in the collection of the Rijksmuseum and the Instituut Collectie Nederland.

== See also ==
- List of Dutch painters
- Media related to Elisabeth Barbara Schmetterling at Wikimedia Commons
