= Miniature food =

Small-scale food item, either edible or an inedible decoration

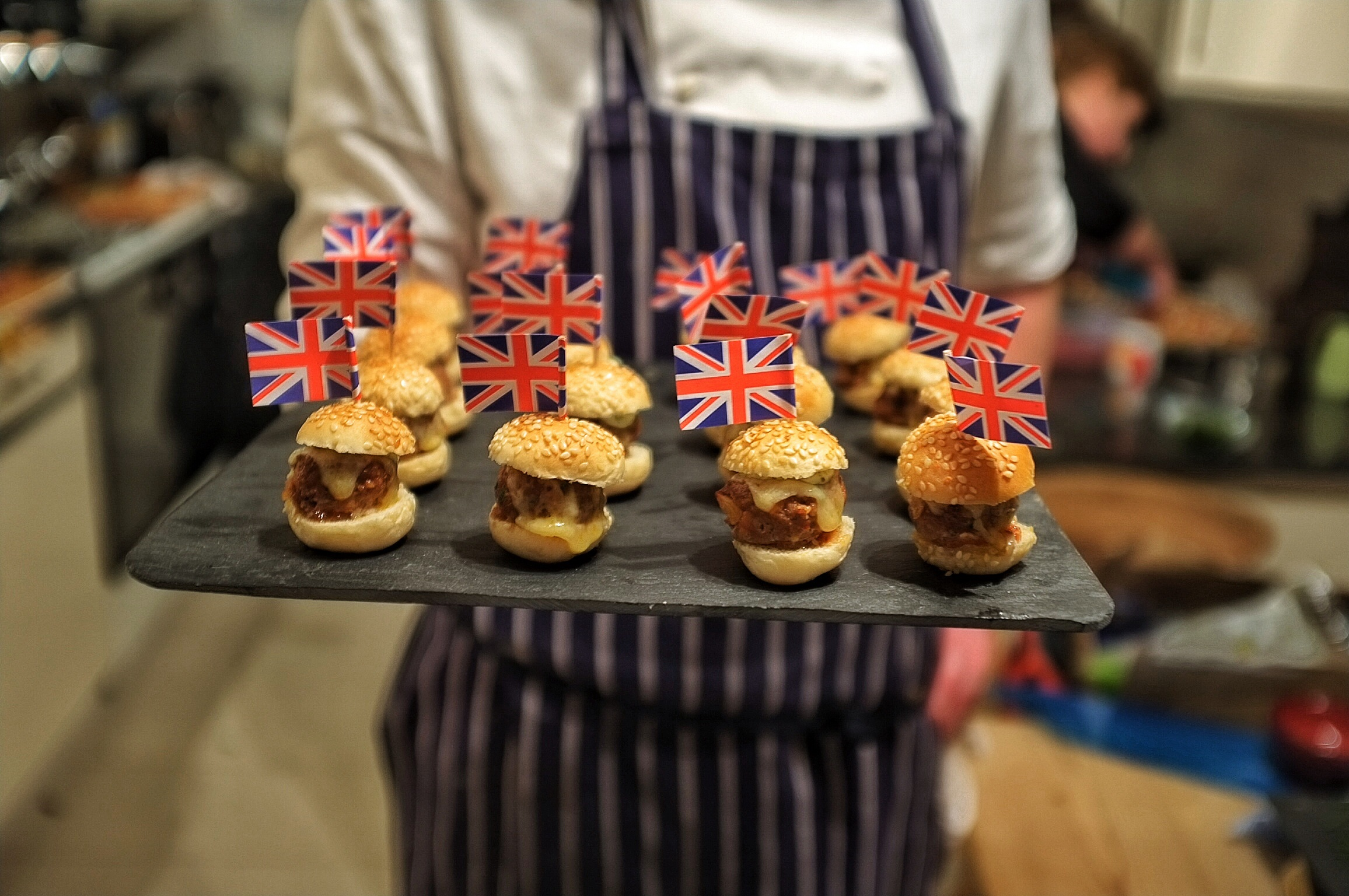
Miniature hamburgers with pickles and smoked red onion relish in sesame buns

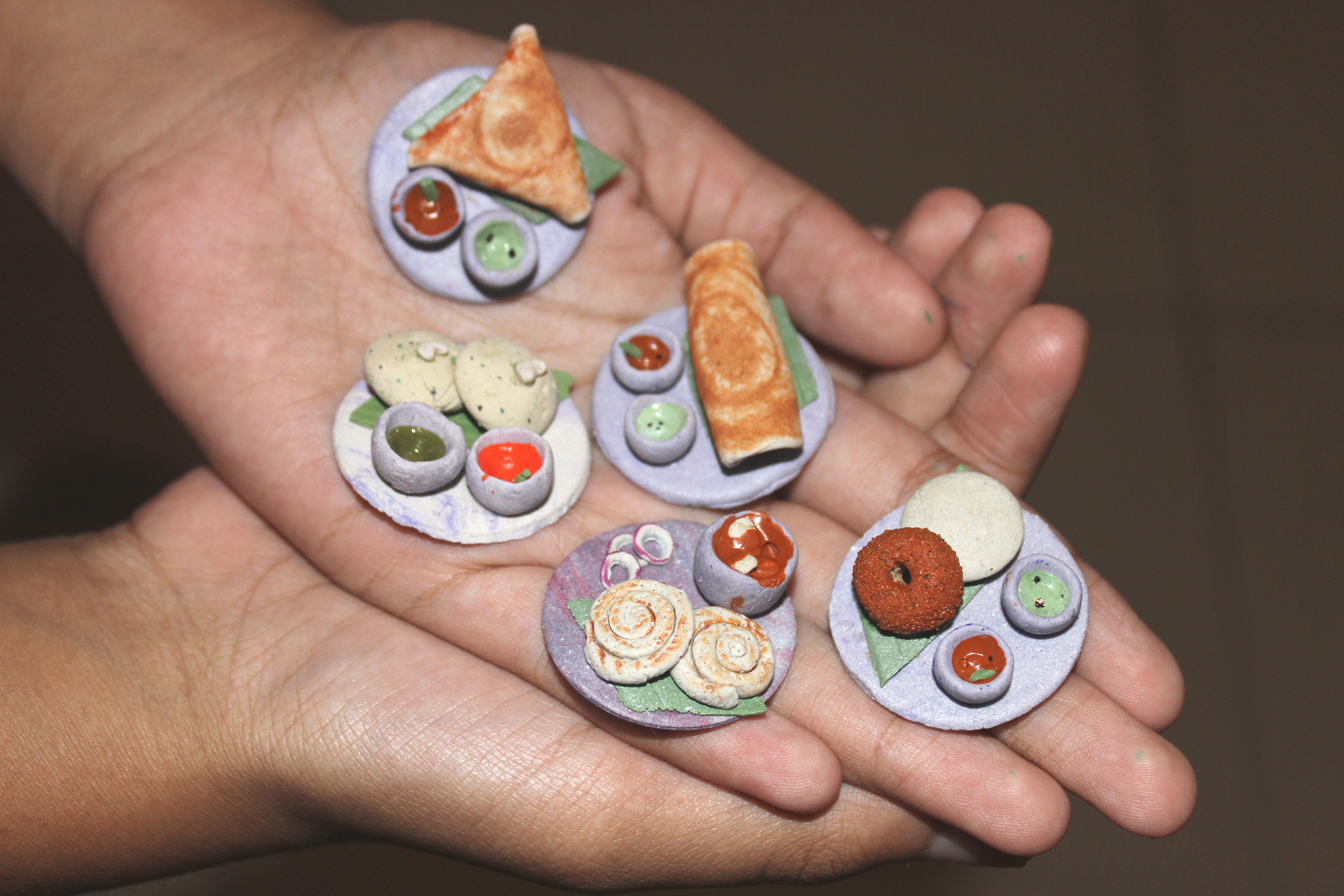
Miniature clay models of Indian dishes

Miniature food is a replica of a dish made at a much smaller scale than the original. It may be in the form of an inedible toy or accessory, or an edible foodstuff either made from the same ingredients as the original dish, candy or other substitute and with real working miniature kitchen and cookwares. Miniature food is an example of miniature art.

== History ==
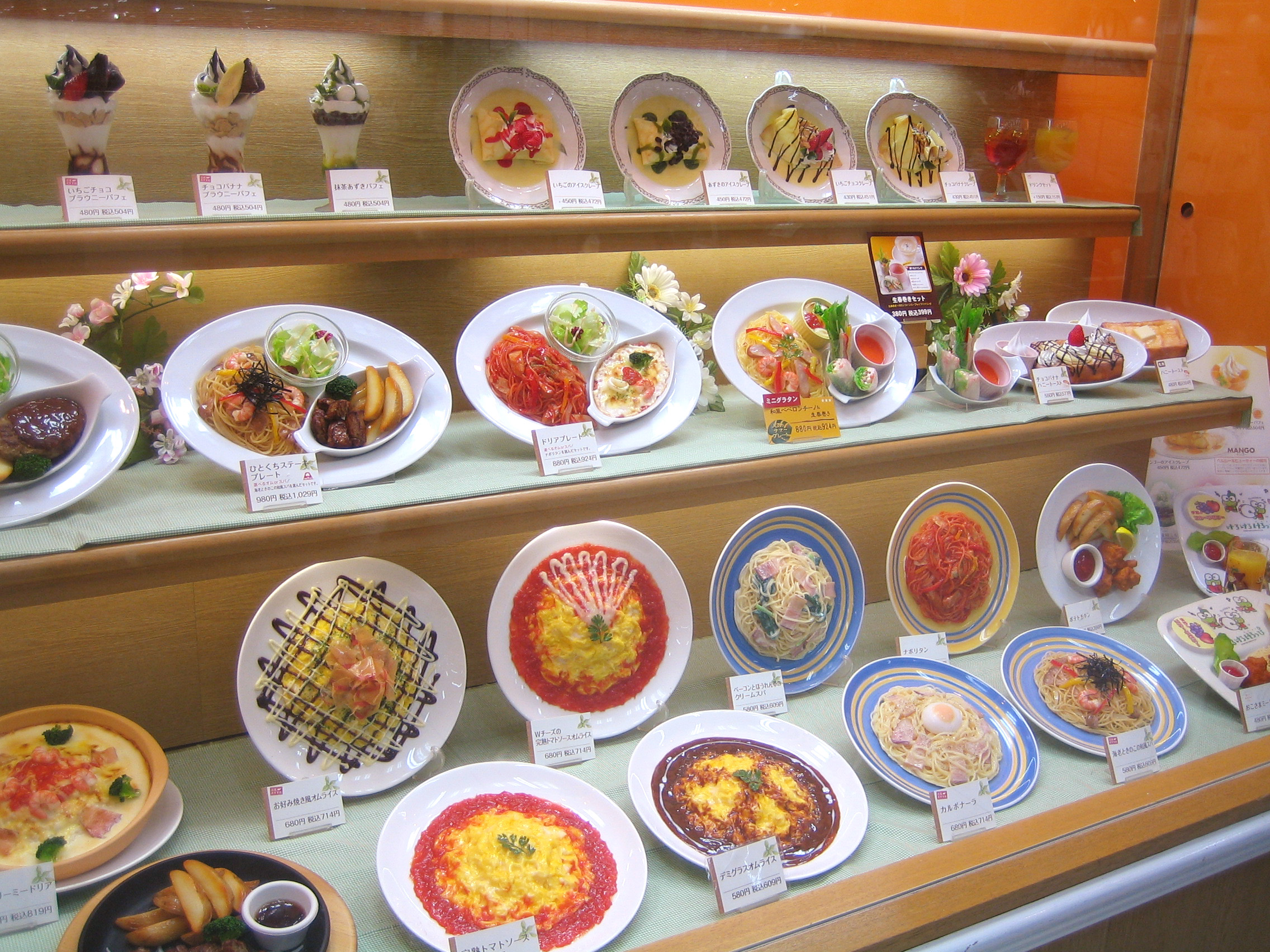
Model food dishes in a restaurant in Japan

Regular-sized food models first appeared in Uichi, Japan, in 1917, to display previews of food in the windows of restaurants. Businesses that produced and sold the food models were set up by Iwasaki Ryuzo in 1932. Early models of food were made from wax; nowadays, they are mostly made from plastic and polymer clay, a heat-dependable type of clay.

Generally delicate and tiny items are called "kawaii" in Japanese; miniature food is created with the Japanese miniature-art techniques of recent decades. The creation of miniature food with edible ingredients was popularized by YouTubers Miniature Space and AAAjoken. In 2015, a report from video-intelligence firm Tubular Labs indicated that these miniature food videos contributed up to 3% of the total views in the food category.

== Edible miniature food ==
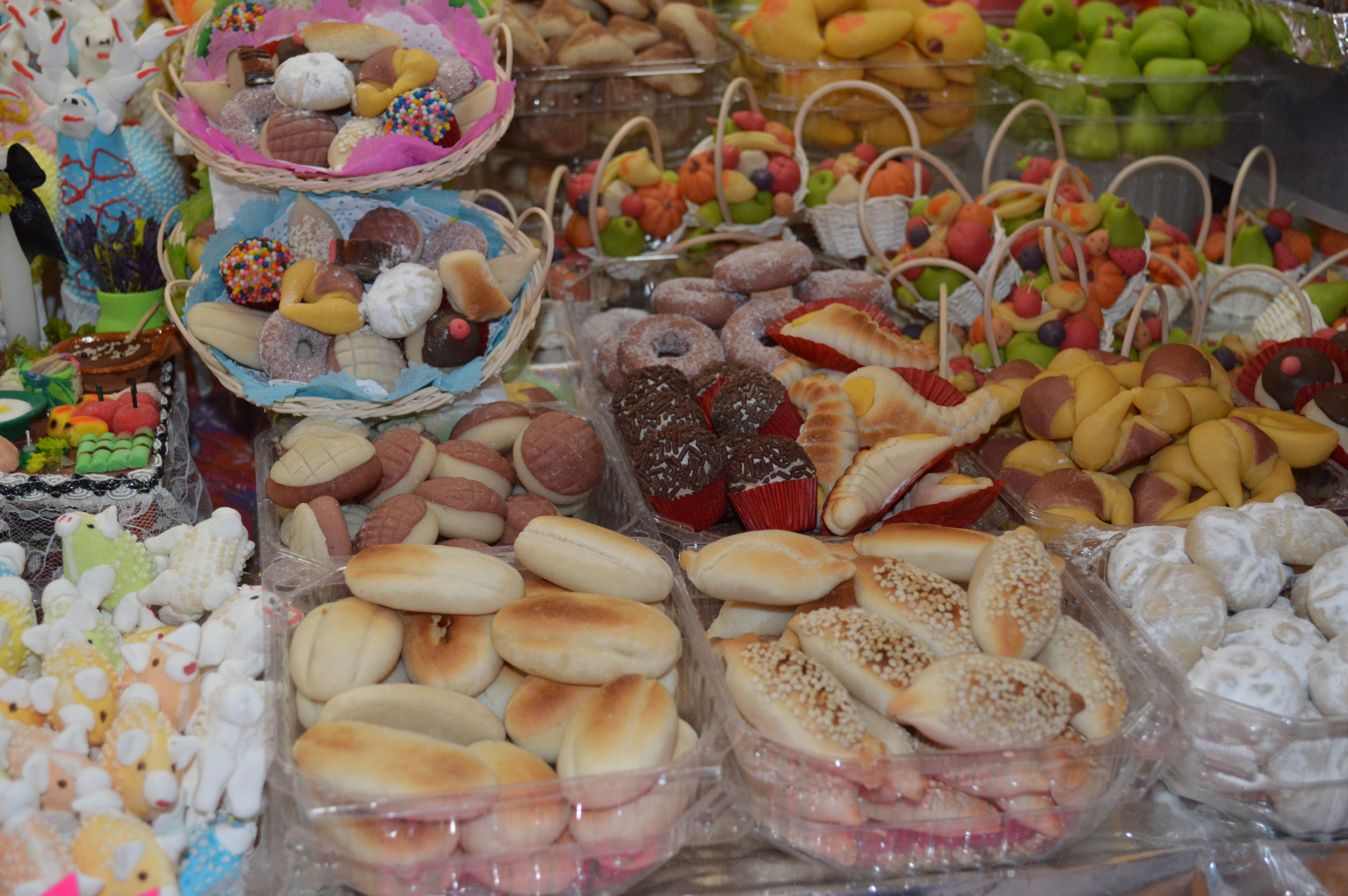
Miniature candy foods in the shape of pan dulces and fruit at the Feria del Alfeñique in Toluca, State of Mexico

Miniature food can be either edible or inedible. Edible miniature food is made from real ingredients cooked with miniature utensils like tiny woks, pans, and knives. In order to make the miniature food look more realistic, the ingredients will sometimes vary from the original recipes. The food may not be cooked in any type of ceramic cooker. Miniature stoves powered by candles or small pieces of wood can be used to cook the food.

== Inedible miniature food ==
Inedible miniature food is made from materials like polymer clay, resin, and chalk pastels. It is more common than edible miniature food because it serves a wider variety of purposes, such as jewelry, handicrafts, and toys. Also, while ingredients used in edible miniature food are limited, there are more options when making inedible miniature food. The food and the utensils are usually made of polymer clay and dry glue. The artists use dedicated modeling tools to mould and shape the food; sometimes utensils such as sewing needles and toothpicks are also seen in the process of moulding and shaping.

People can purchase these tiny creations to decorate their households or workplaces, and some buy miniature food as gifts, or to collect.

== Artists ==
Tomo Tanaka, who lives in Osaka, makes items in 1:12 and 1:24 scale for display.

The YouTube channel Miniature Space uploads videos of making edible miniature meals with ingredients like quail eggs, chicken, and fish. Caroline McFarlane-Watts of Tall Tales Productions makes miniature items in 1:12 scale for film, TV, display, and collectors, and YouTube videos.

Shay Aaron, a miniature-food jewelry artist, makes jewelry collections with the polymer clay Fimo and other materials, such as metal and paper, in 1:12 scale.

== See also ==
- Dymkovo toys
