= Nikolai Aldunin =

Russian artist (born 1956)

Nikolai Aldunin (born September 1, 1956) is a Russian artist noted for his microscopic art described as "masterpieces" and "pioneering work", "famous in Russia and around the world". His work includes a T-34 tank a fraction of the size of an apple seed and composed of more than 200 pieces, made of pure gold and described as "perfect copy of a real vehicle"; a gold saddle and horseshoes for a flea; and a camel train in the eye of a needle.

He has motivated the creation of a museum for miniatures in Moscow.
