= Mohamed Temam =

Algerian painter (1915–1988)

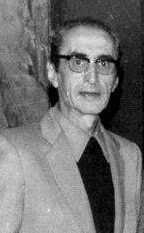
- Born: February 23, 1915; Algiers
- Died: July 15, 1988 (aged 73)
- Occupations: Illuminator; Painter; Postage stamp designer

Mohamed Temam or Mohamed Temmam (23 February 1915 Algiers – 15 July 1988 Algiers) was an Algerian miniaturist painter and illuminator.

His miniature painting of the Kaaba in Mecca was featured on a commemorative stamp issued by Algeria in 1978.

== Bibliography ==
- Peintres algériens, textes d'Edmond Michelet et Mourad Bourboune, Musée des Arts décoratifs de Paris, Paris, 1964
- Mohammed Khadda, Éléments pour un art nouveau, SNED, Alger, 1972 (p. 49)
- Musées d'Algérie, l'Art Populaire et Contemporain, Collection Art et Culture, Ministère de L'Information et la Culture, SNED, Alger, 1973
- Mohammed Khadda, Feuillets épars liés, SNED, Alger, 1983
- Dalila Mahhamed-Orfali, Chefs d'œuvre du Musée national des beaux-arts d'Alger, Alger, 1999 (reproduction : L'homme en bleu, n° 79).
- Mansour Abrous, Les artistes algériens, Dictionnaire biographique, 1917–1999, Alger, Casbah éditions, 2002 (p. 212–214)(in French)
- Ramon Tio Bellido; Malika Dorbani Bouabdellah; Dalila Mahammad Orfali; Fatma Zohra Zamoum (2003). Le XXe siècle dans l'art algérien. Marsailles & Paris: Château Borély. pp. 34–37, 201–202. ISBN 2950676812.
