= Mallikarjuna Reddy =

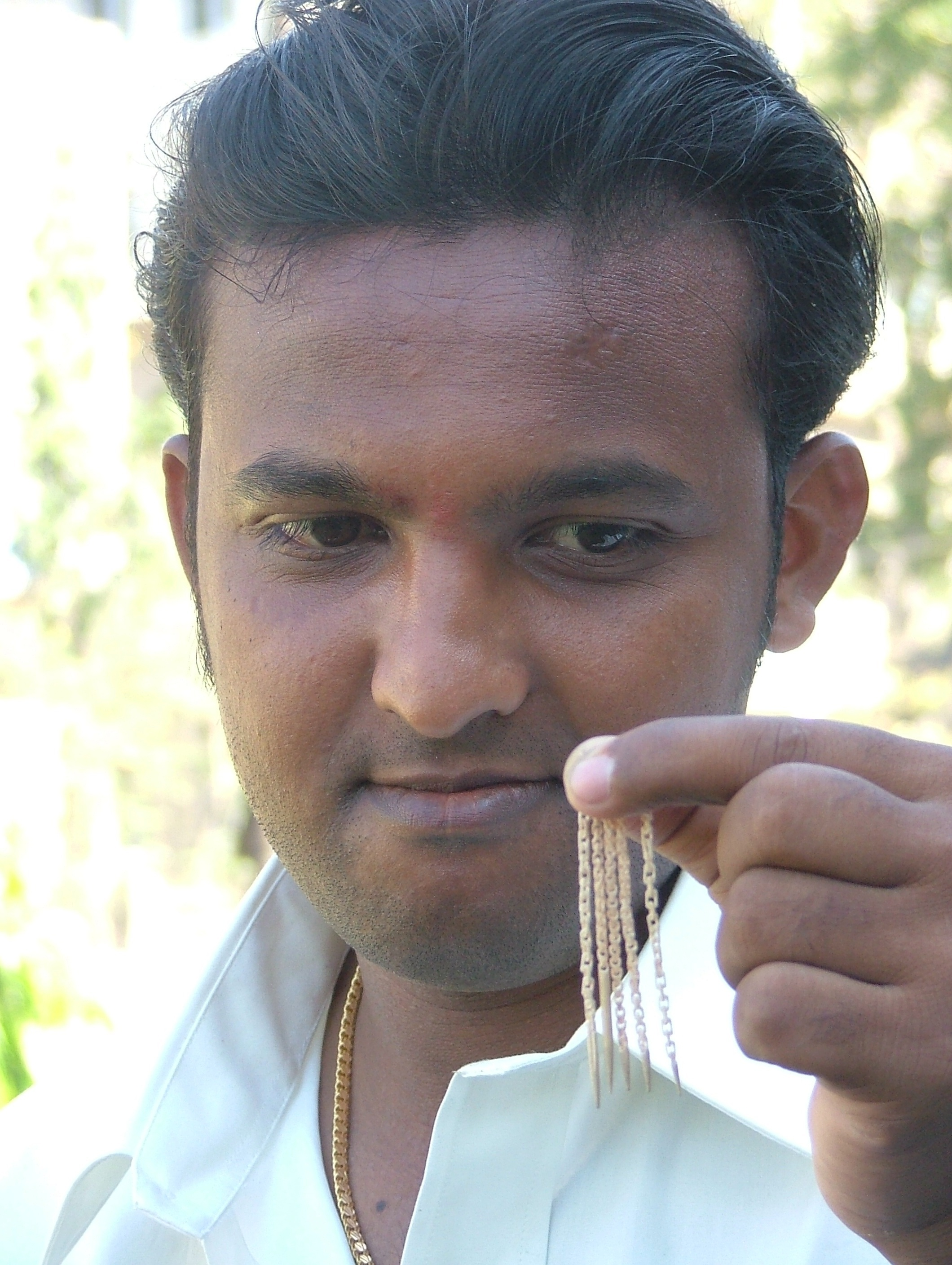
- Born: Mallikarjuna Reddy; 24 August 1981 (age 45); Thoppanahalli, Karnataka, India
- Known for: Miniature sculpture
- Awards: Guinness World Record

Mallikarjuna Reddy (born 24 August 1981) is a miniature sculptor, Guinness World Record Holder, and the creator of the world's smallest monolithic sculptures. He constructed 18 sculptures on a single rice grain, without using magnification lenses.

== Life and work ==
Mallikarjuna Reddy was born to Changalaraya Reddy a landlord in Thoppanahalli, a village in Bangarpet, Kolar district, Karnataka, India.

He taught himself caricature around the age of nine but later, in 2000, moved to Bangalore to study Biotechnology at the Reddy Jana Sangha College. Whilst there he developed his interest in working with miniatures and began to create microscopic sculptures. In 2001, he exhibited at the Karnataka Chitrakala Parishath.

He gained publicity from journalist and photographer Manjunath Kiran, but remained an amateur. In February 2005 he was recognized as the Guinness World Record Holder after creating a 28-link chain on a single toothpick. The previous record of 17 links had been established by Bob Shammy in 1991.

Reddy then worked in social service and took up political activities and in due course he moved back to his native village to found his Akshara International School. Aside from educating children in conventional subjects, he teaches his skills of miniature sculpting to the children and to people with mental and physical disabilities.

== Awards and honours ==
- Limca Book of Records - 2004
- Guinness World Records – 2005
- Sri Sai Seva Award - 2005
- Kannada Rajyotsava Swabhimana Award - 2006
- All India Achievers Award - 2007
- Fellowship outstanding Artist Award - 2009

== Sources ==
- http://archive.deccanherald.com/deccanherald/sep132005/city2123332005912.asp
- http://archive.deccanherald.com/deccanherald/feb222005/s2.asp
- https://web.archive.org/web/20081007094635/http://news.indiainfo.com/2005/02/23/2302guinness.html
- http://www.expressindia.com/news/fullstory.php?newsid=54517#compstory
- http://www.indiavarta.com/education/news/ivNews.asp?Topic=0&Title=Education+Features&ID=IFZ20050311110201&nDate=3/11/2005&Sub=&Cat=Z&
