= Translations of One Thousand and One Nights =

List of translations of literary work

Translations of One Thousand and One Nights have been made into most of the world's major languages. They include the French translation by Antoine Galland (titled Les mille et une nuits, finished in 1717). Galland's translation was essentially based on a medieval Arabic manuscript of Syrian origin, supplemented by oral tales recorded by him in Paris from Hanna Diyab, a Maronite Arab from Aleppo.

The first English translation appeared in 1706 and was made from Galland's version; being anonymous, it is known as the Grub Street edition. There are two extant copies, one kept in the Bodleian Library and one in Princeton University Library. After this, several English reissues appeared simultaneously in 1708. As early as the end of the 18th century the English translation based on Galland was brought to Halifax, Nova Scotia, Montreal, Philadelphia, New York and Sydney. Generally, translations starting from Galland were censored due to lewd content.

Meanwhile, the original scattered Arabic texts were collected and printed in four corpora:

- the Calcutta I or Shirwanee Edition (1814–18, 2 volumes)
- the Bulaq or Cairo Edition (1835, 2 volumes)
- the Breslau Edition (1825–38, 8 volumes)
- the Calcutta II or W.H. Macnaghten Edition (1839–42, 4 volumes)

Galland-based English translations were superseded by that made by Edward William Lane in 1839–41. In the 1880s an unexpurgated and complete English translation, The Book of the Thousand Nights and a Night, was made by Richard Francis Burton.

== French translations ==
=== Galland ===
Galland based his translation on what is now known as the Galland Manuscript, a three-volume (or perhaps once four-volume) manuscript from the fourteenth or fifteenth century now kept in the National Library of France. He published his translation in a twelve-volume set between 1704 and 1717. Galland's translation altered the style, tone and content of the Arabic text. Designed to appeal, it omitted sophisticated or dark elements while enhancing exotic and magical elements and became the basis of most children's versions of One Thousand and One Nights.

=== Mardrus ===
In 1926–1932 a lavishly decorated 12-volume edition of J. C. Mardrus' translation, titled Le livre des mille nuits et une nuit, appeared (based on the Bulaq edition). Soviet and Russian scholar Isaak Filshtinsky, however, considered Mardrus' translation inferior to others due to presence of chunks of text which Mardrus conceived himself to satisfy the tastes of his time. According to Robert Irwin, "Mardrus took elements which were there in the original Arabic and worked them up, exaggerating and inventing, reshaping the Nights in such a manner that the stories appear at times to have been written by Oscar Wilde or Stéphane Mallarmé". In response to criticism of his translation by academic Arabists, Mardrus promised to produce a tome of learned commentary and justificatory pieces which he, however, failed to do.

== Portuguese translations ==
- Mamede Mustafa Jarouche (2005–2021). Published by Editora Globo in five volumes, this is the first direct translation from Arabic into Portuguese in Brazil. Jarouche based his work on the Galland manuscript and other primary sources, providing an extensive critical apparatus. The translation received the Prêmio Jabuti for its scholarly contribution.

== Russian translations ==
The first Russian translation of One Thousand and One Nights, in Russian: Тысяча и одна ночь (Týsjača i odná nočʹ), was made by Alexey Filatyev in 1763–1774. It was based on Galland's translation and consisted of 12 volumes. Later Russian translations were also based on European translations. For instance, a three-volume translation by Yulia Doppelmayr (1889–1890) was based on Galland, the six-volume translation by Lyudmila Shelgunova (1894) was based on that by Edward William Lane and an anonymous translation (1902–1903) was based on Mardrus.

The first Russian translation directly from the Arabic source (from Calcutta II) was made by Mikhail Salye, published in eight volumes by Academia in 1929–1939. Later, in 1961, Salye also translated seven tales not contained in Calcutta II (from the Mikha'il Sabbagh manuscript ANS 355 in the National Library of Russia), in his book "Халиф на час. Новые сказки из книги «Тысячи и одной ночи" (Caliph for an Hour: New Tales from the Arabian Nights)

== English translations ==
Departing from the Grub Street version, Jonathan Scott made the first literal translation of Galland. This rendition, entitled The Arabian Nights Entertainments, appeared in 1811.

Henry Whitelock Torrens would later translate the first 50 nights from Calcutta II, published in 1838. Having heard that Edward William Lane had begun his own translation, Torrens abandoned his work. Lane translated from the Bulaq corpus. In his opinion, "Galland [had] excessively perverted the work". According to Lane, Galland's "acquaintance with Arab manners and customs was insufficient to preserve him always from errors of the grossest description". Working with the Bulaq corpus, Lane occasionally crosschecked against the Calcutta I and Breslau corpora. His translation, however, was incomplete.

In 1923, a translation by Edward Powys Mathers based on the French translation by J. C. Mardrus appeared.

The first English translation solely by a female author was published by Yasmine Seale in November 2021. It includes all the tales from Hanna Diyab, as well as previously omitted stories featuring female protagonists (such as tales about Parizade, Pari Banu, and the horror story Sidi Numan).

=== Burton ===
Another attempt at translation was made by John Payne (The Book of the Thousand Nights and One Night, 1882–84), conflated from the Bulaq and Macnaghten texts. Payne printed only 500 copies, for private distribution, and ceded the work to Richard Francis Burton. Burton's translation (The Book of the Thousand Nights and a Night 1885–88) enjoyed huge public success but was criticised for its use of archaic language and excessive erotic detail. According to Ulrich Marzolph, as of 2004, Burton's translation remained the most complete version of One Thousand and One Nights in English. It is generally considered one of the finest unexpurgated translations from Calcutta II. It still stands as the only complete translation of the Macnaghten or Calcutta II edition (Egyptian recension).

=== Known translations in English ===
1. Anonymous from Grub Street, The Arabian Nights' Entertainments (1706-21) - Based on Antoine Galland
2. Jonathan Scott, The Arabian Nights Entertainments (1811)
3. George Lamb, (1826) - Based on Joseph von Hammer-Purgstall, in three volumes
4. Henry Torrens, The Book of the Thousand Nights and One Night, Vol. I (1838) - Based on Calcutta II, one volume completed of an intended series
5. Edward William Lane, The thousand and one nights : commonly called, in England, the Arabian nights' entertainments (1838-40) - Based on the Bulaq corpus along with the Calcutta I and Breslau corpus, in three volumes
6. John Payne, The Book of the Thousand Nights and One Night (1882–84) - Based on Calcutta II, in three volumes
7. Edward Powys Mathers, The Thousand Nights and One Night (1923) - Based on J. C. Mardrus, in four volumes
8. Malcolm C. Lyons and Ursula Lyons, The Arabian Nights: Tales of 1001 Nights (2008) - Based on the Macnaghten or Calcutta II edition (Egyptian recension), in three volumes
9. Husain Haddawy, The Arabian Nights (2010) - Based on the Muhsin Mahdi critical edition
10. Yasmine Seale, The Annotated Arabian Nights: Tales from 1001 Nights (2021) - A selection of stories based on Diyab and unspecified other sources

== German translations ==
In 1825, a Galland-based translation was made by Maximilian Habicht. Duncan Black MacDonald later proved that the Tunisian manuscript Habicht claimed to use during the translation was in fact forged by Habicht.

In 1839–1842 One Thousand and One Nights was translated into German by Gustav Weil.

From 1895 to 1897, Max Henning published another German translation in 24 small volumes; the first seven volumes were based on the Bulaq edition, while volumes 18–24 were largely translated from Richard Francis Burton. In 1912–13 another translation was made by Felix Paul Greve.

In 1921–1928, Enno Littmann produced a six-volume German translation of the whole One Thousand and One Nights based on Calcutta II. This included the poetry contained in the text. He translated one lewd portion into Latin rather than German. Nonetheless, Isaak Filshtinsky considered Littmann's translation to be "the most complete and accomplished". Robert Irwin pronounced it "the best German translation".

In 2004, C. H. Beck published Claudia Ott's translation of the critical edition of the Galland Manuscript by Muhsin Mahdi. Ott won the Johann-Friedrich-von-Cotta-Literatur- und Übersetzerpreis der Landeshauptstadt Stuttgart for her translation.

== Dutch translations ==
A number of Dutch translations have been made from the French editions of Galland and Mardrus.

In 1999, the final volume of De vertellingen van duizend-en-één nacht was published, the only Dutch translation from the Arabic texts, by Dr. Richard van Leeuwen. For his translation, van Leeuwen used the Bulaq (Cairo 1835), Calcutta (1842) and Mahdi (Leiden 1984) editions.

== Italian translation ==
In 1949 Arabist Francesco Gabrieli, who headed a team of anonymous translators, produced a four-volume Italian translation, based on Bulaq collated with Calcutta II.

== Spanish translations ==
The stories about Sinbad the Sailor had already been translated into Spanish by 1253. Later Spanish translations were made particularly by Pedro Pedraza (from Galland); Vicente Blasco Ibáñez (from Mardrus) and Eugenio Sanz del Valle, Luis Aguirre Prado and Alfredo Domínguez (from Mardrus). More accurate translations were made by Rafael Cansinos Asséns and the Arabists Juan Vernet, Juan A.G. Larraya and Leonor Martínez Martín or Salvador Peña.

== Turkish translations ==
Various translations were done during the Ottoman Empire from Arabian manuscripts. A first one was done in the fifteenth century. Another was done in 1636, under orders of Sultan Murad IV by Muslih bin Mehmet Beyânî.

== Japanese translations ==
One Thousand and One Nights appeared in Japanese in as early as 1875. The two-volume translation, made by Hideki Nagamine (永峰秀樹), was titled Arabiya monogatari : Kaikan kyōki (暴夜物語 : 開巻驚奇) and published in Tokyo by Nihon Hyōronsha (日本評論社). In the preface, Nagamine wrote that he used G. F. Townsend's The Arabian Nights's Entertainments, which was based on Jonathan Scott's English translation of Galland. Nagamine also used Edward William Lane's English translation as a supplement. The second Japanese translation by Inoue Tsutomu, titled Zensekai ichidai kisho (The Most Curious Book in the Whole World), appeared in 1883 and became more popular than Nagamine's.

Subsequently, other Japanese translations were made, but the first complete Japanese translation from Arabic was published in 1976–92 by Shinji Maejima and Ikeda Osamu, in nineteen volumes (titled Arabian Naito).

== Chinese translations ==
A selection of stories from One Thousand and One Nights, titled Yi Qian Ling Yi Ye (一千零一夜) appeared in 1900. In 1906 a four-volume translation was made by Xi Ruo (奚若), published in Shanghai. In the 1930 new translations, primarily from Bulaq, appeared, also under the title Yi Qian Ling Yi Ye. In that period a five-volume translation by Na Xun (纳训) was made. In the 1950s Na Xun produced another three-volume translation, again titled Yi Qian Ling Yi Ye. In 1982 a six-volume Beijing edition of Na Xun was published. It became the source of the 1980s two-volume translation titled Tian Fang Ye Tan (天方夜譚), which appeared in Taipei. Finally, a ten-volume translation of the Bulaq edition by Li Weizhong (李唯中) was published in Taipei in 2000.

== Hebrew translations ==
From 1947 to 1971 Arabist Yosef Yoel Rivlin produced a 32-volume Hebrew translation, based mainly on Bulaq. A selection of stories, translated by Hanna Amit-Kohavi, appeared in two volumes, in the years 2008 and 2011, under the title Leylot Arav.

== Kashmiri translations ==
Aalif Laila, a translation of the stories in Kashmiri, was made by Mohiuddin Hajni in 1969. It was published by the Sahitya Akademi, the Indian national academy of letters.

== Catalan translations ==
A complete translation into Catalan, by Arabists Margarida Castells and Dolors Cinca, was published in 1999: Les mil i una nits (Barcelona: Edicions Proa, ISBN 978-84-8256-180-6 / ISBN 84-8256-180-4), in three volumes. It is based on the Bulaq edition, includes the apocryphal tales from Galland as an appendix and has been the basis for several published anthologies.

== Bosnian translations ==
In 1999, a four-volume Bosnian translation was published. The Bulaq version was translated by Esad Durakovic during the siege of Sarajevo.

== Telugu translations ==
Veyyinnokka Ratrulu (2003), a translation of the stories in Telugu, was published by the Sahitya Akademi, the Indian national academy of letters. The translation work was done by writer Ghandikota Brahmaji Rao.

== Malayalam translations ==
Ayirathonnu Raavukal (2011), a single-volume translation of the Nights, was published by Mathrubhumi Books in Malayalam with Indian literary critic M. Achuthan serving as its editor. Another translation into Malayalam, Ayirathonnu Rathrikal by M. P. Sadasivan, was published by DC Books in 2008.

Meenaketanacharitram (1850–1860), a story by Ayilyam Thirunal Rama Varma, the ruler of the Indian princely state of Travancore, was loosely based on Edward William Lane's translation of "The Story of the Prince Kamar-Ez-Zeman and the Princess Budoor" from the Nights.

== Slovenian translation ==
In 2019 a three-volume Slovenian translation was published. Based on the Calcutta II version, it was translated by Mohsen and Margit Alhady.

== Sources ==
- Zipes, Jack (2007). When Dreams Came True: Classical Fairy Tales and Their Tradition. Taylor & Francis. ISBN 978-0415980067.
- Marzolph, Ulrich (2004). The Arabian Nights Encyclopedia. Vol. 1. ABC-CLIO. ISBN 1576072045.
- Irwin, Robert (2004). The Arabian Nights: A Companion. Tauris Parke Paperbacks. ISBN 1860649831.
- Nishio, Tetsuo; Yamanaka, Yuriko (2006). Arabian Nights and Orientalism: Perspectives from East and West. I.B.Tauris. ISBN 0857710508.
