= Mohamed Ranem =

Algerian miniature artist

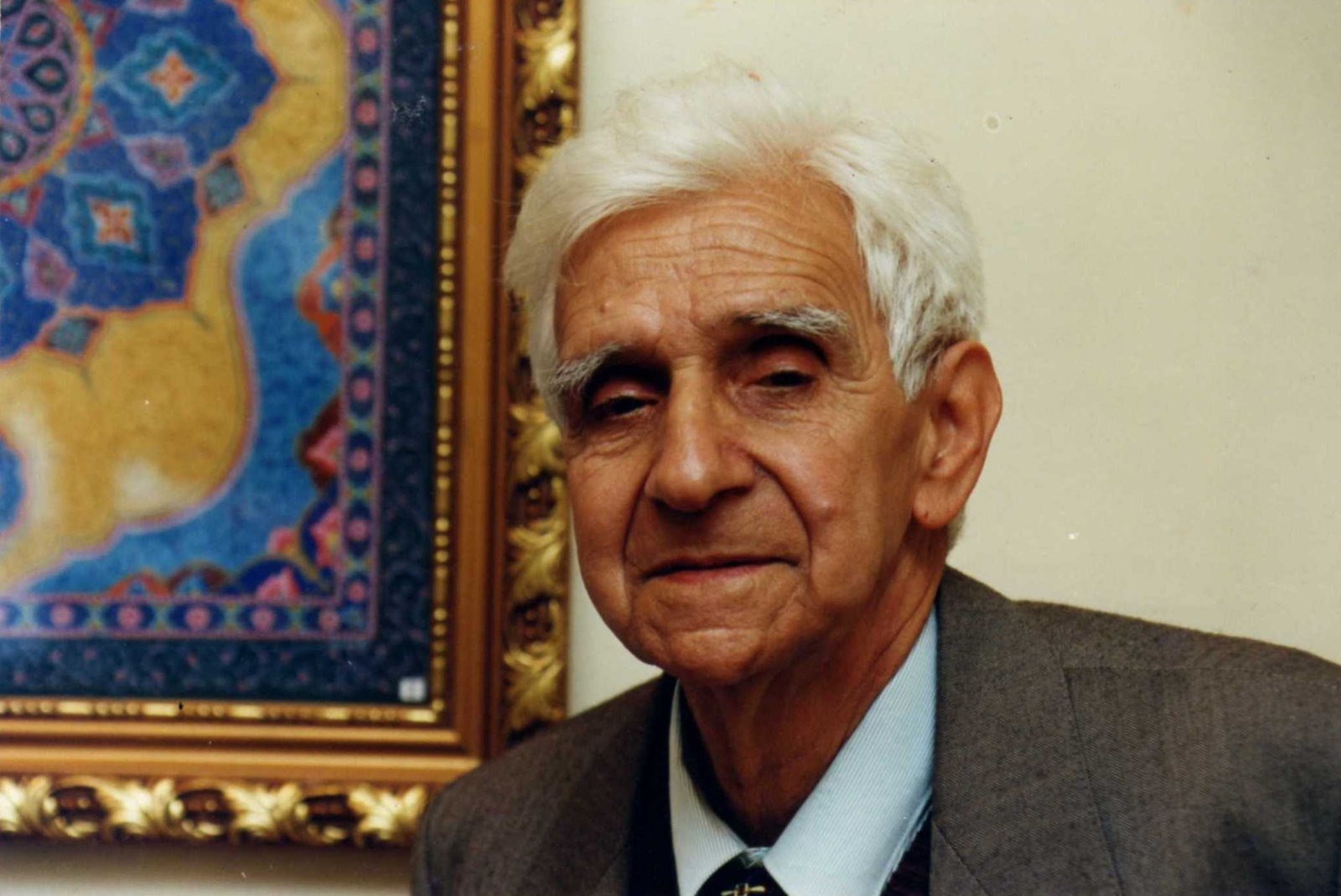
- Mohamed Ranem in 2010
- Born: 5 November 1925; Algiers, Algeria
- Died: 11 December 2014 (aged 89); Algiers, Algeria
- Other name: Mohamed Ghanem
- Education: Omar Racim
- Known for: Painting, drawing, ceramics, Arabic miniature

Mohamed Ghanem (5 November 1925 – 11 December 2014), known as Mohamed Ranem, was an Algerian painter, miniaturist, ornamental artist, ceramic artist, and art teacher. He is considered one of the most important figures in the preservation, development, and transmission of the art of Algerian miniature painting and illumination for subsequent generations. He combined the precision of traditional craftsmanship with the richness of artistic imagination and transformed Islamic and Algerian heritage, with its ornaments, architecture, scripts, and historical scenes, into an artistic language that preserved its authenticity while opening itself to the spirit of his time.

He began his artistic training when young at the Frais-Vallon school, an annex of the National Museum of Fine Arts of Algiers, where he studied under the direction of Omar Racim and was influenced by the revival movement of Algerian miniature painting. During his studies, he received varied training that included miniature painting, illumination, drawing, sculpture, bookbinding, and ceramics, later reflected in the diversity of his techniques and artistic subjects.

From the 1940s onward, Ranem exhibited his works in Algeria's leading salons and exhibitions, and at the beginning of his career he received the Prize of the City of Algiers. He was also among the Algerian artists who brought the distinctive character of Algerian Islamic art to Paris when this was one of the world's leading art capitals and a preferred destination for major painters and creators from different countries. There, Ranem repeatedly organised solo exhibitions and presented his works in major galleries and institutions, including the Galerie Bernheim-Jeune, the OFALAC gallery, and the Cercle de la France d'outre-mer, introducing European audiences to Algerian miniature painting and illumination as a living art capable of asserting itself beyond its original cultural boundaries.

In 1960, he joined the teaching staff of the School of Fine Arts of Algiers, where he succeeded his master Omar Racim and taught miniature painting and illumination. He thus played an important role in the continuity of this art within Algerian academic institutions, both before and after independence. Ranem's works are distinguished by the diversity of their techniques and subjects. He practised miniature painting, illumination, painting, ceramics, and bookbinding, and drew inspiration from scenes of the Casbah, ships, gatherings, festivities, and Algerian architecture, as well as richly decorated Quranic pages. Among his most important documented works are Two Pages of the Quran, held in the Algerian art collection of the National Museum of Fine Arts of Algiers. His works are also represented in the collections of the National Museum of Illumination, Miniature and Calligraphy. The Algerian press described him as one of the senior figures of the visual arts and as "the worthy heir to the art of the Racim family", a description that summarises his position as an essential link between the founding generation of modern Algerian miniature painting and the generations that continued this art after independence.

After Ranem's death his works continued to circulate in auction houses and art exhibitions, particularly in Paris, where his miniatures, works on paper, and ceramic pieces appeared in several documented sales. This attests to the continued transmission of his works among different collections and the preservation of their place in the Algerian and Maghrebi art market.

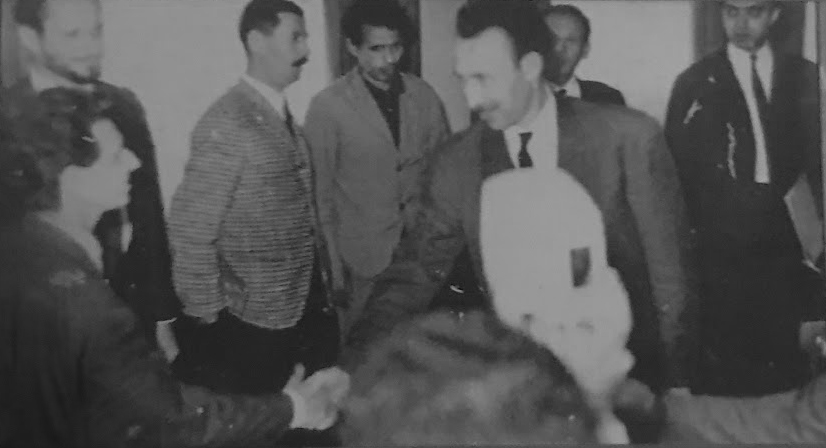
Mohamed Ranem with Houari Boumédiène.

With a career spanning more than seven decades, Mohamed Ranem appears as one of the major figures of 20th-century Algerian visual art and as one of the principal guardians of Algerian visual memory. He took miniature painting and illumination beyond the narrow limits of traditional practice and introducing them into exhibition halls, educational institutions, museums, and international spaces, combining the roles of artist, teacher, and heritage conservator. He did not merely imitate the past but reinterpreted it through a personal artistic language, making Algerian heritage a material for creation and dialogue with the world.

== Early artistic career ==
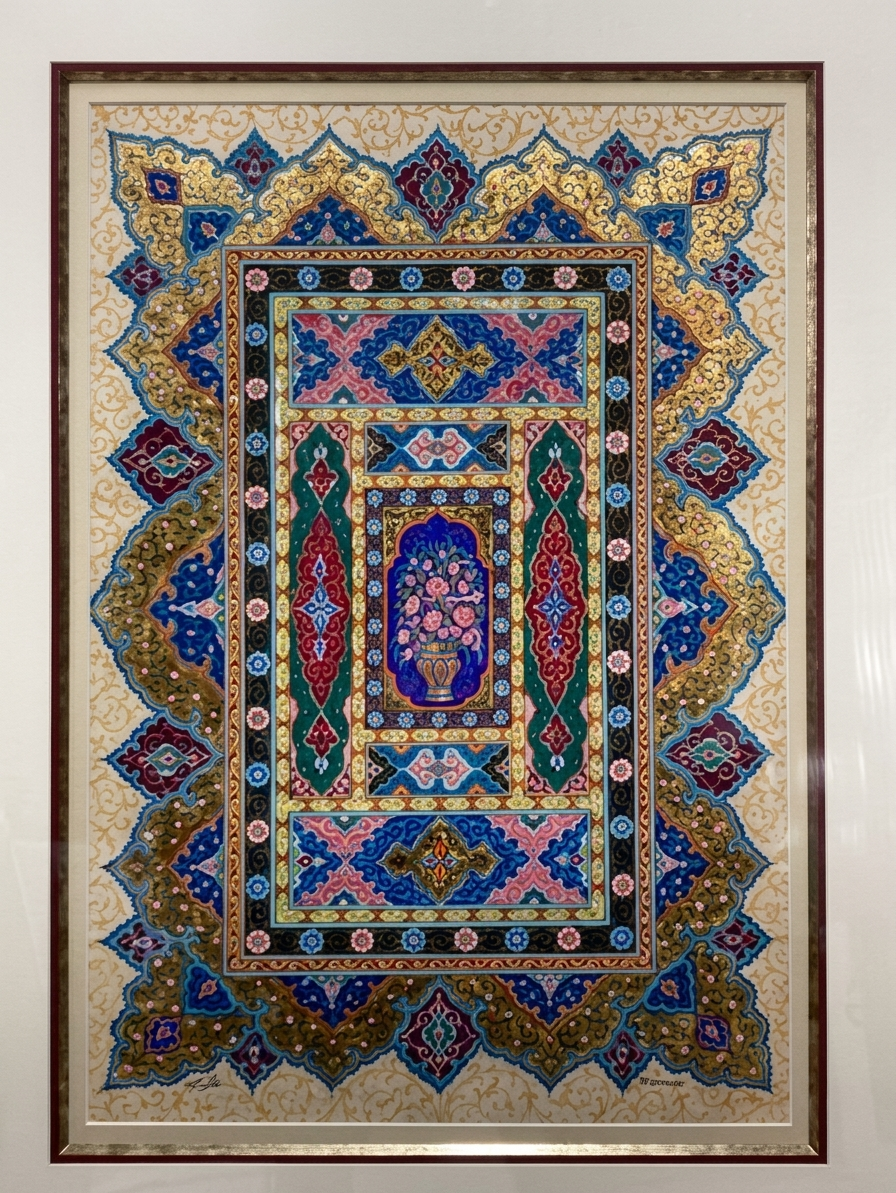
Miniature by Mohamed Ranem

At the age of fifteen, Mohamed Ranem took courses in Algerian Muslim art under the direction of Omar Racim at the Frais-Vallon school, an annex of the National Museum of Fine Arts of Algiers. Founded in 1931, this taught traditional arts. In the mornings, Ranem studied miniature painting and illumination, and in the afternoons, sculpture in the round, elementary drawing, and bookbinding. He also trained in ceramics in the class of Mohamed Cherrad. In 1940, he received a first prize in bookbinding. In 1941, when the Frais-Vallon school had just been attached to the School of Fine Arts on Rue d'Orléans, he also received a first prize in illumination and ceramics.

From 1942 onward, the young Ranem exhibited his first works at the Salon of Algerian and Orientalist Artists, one of the most important salons of the period, and he was then awarded the Prize of the City of Algiers. In 1943, shortly after completing their studies, Ranem organised an exhibition in Algiers with his fellow student Ali Ali-Khodja. It was held at Baconnier, at 4 Rue Abane-Ramdane. According to a later account by Ranem, the two artists had then completed four years of study and succeeded in selling some of the works presented. He explained that they interpreted these sales as a sign of success in a colonial context in which their material resources were limited.

== Early exhibitions and recognition ==
In 1944, during World War II, Mohammed Racim brought together young Algerian painters and miniaturists in an exhibition at the Franco-Muslim Centre. Twelve young artists presented approximately ninety-five works there.

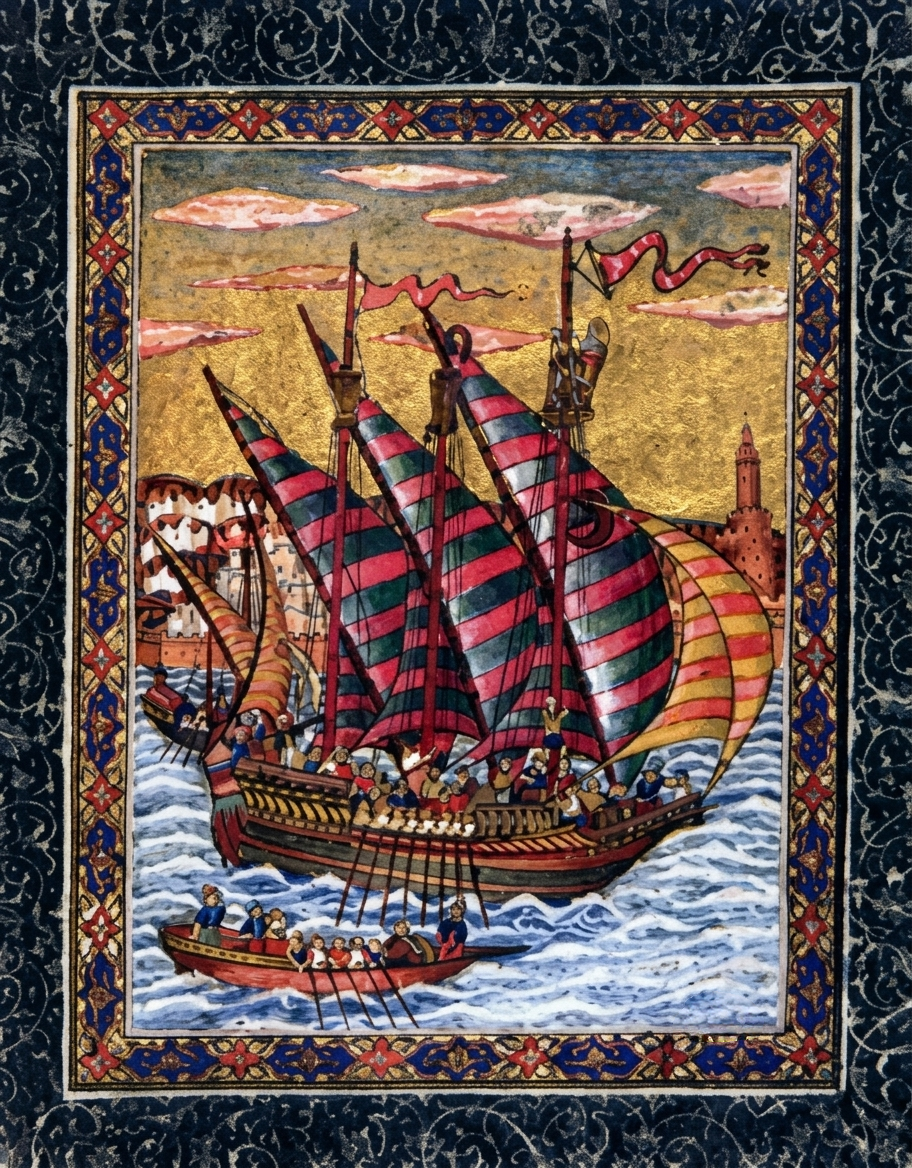
Three Boats in a Port

The Franco-Muslim Centre was then directed by Tocqueville and is said to have been established in February 1944 near the former Place d'Armes, now Martyrs' Square.

The event is presented in some sources as one of the first group exhibitions specifically devoted to young Muslim painters and miniaturists from Algeria. Artists associated with this exhibition included Ali Ali-Khodja, Abdelhalim Hemche, Mohamed Temmam, Bachir Yellès, Mohamed Zmirli, and Mohamed Ranem.

Among those present at the opening were the director of the National School of Fine Arts of Algiers, the painter Alfred Loth, and several residents of the Villa Abd-el-Tif.

The press was unanimous about the interest of this exhibition, and La Dépêche algérienne, L'Écho d'Alger, Alger républicain, and the magazine Tam were unstinting in their praise; Georges Marçais wrote the preface to the catalogue. Ranem, like his peers, whether miniaturists or visual artists, experienced this moment as genuine recognition. In September 1945, he first travelled to Paris, where he exhibited illuminations and miniatures at the Algerian crafts fair. Two years later, in 1947, he had a solo exhibition at the Maison de l'Artisanat on Rue d'Isly. The historian Georges Marçais, who wrote the preface to his catalogue, stated: "He is one of those disciples of Mohamed and Omar Racim, a student of the latter, who is exhibiting his works today: Mohamed Ranem does the greatest honour to his master, and one may predict a fine career for him."

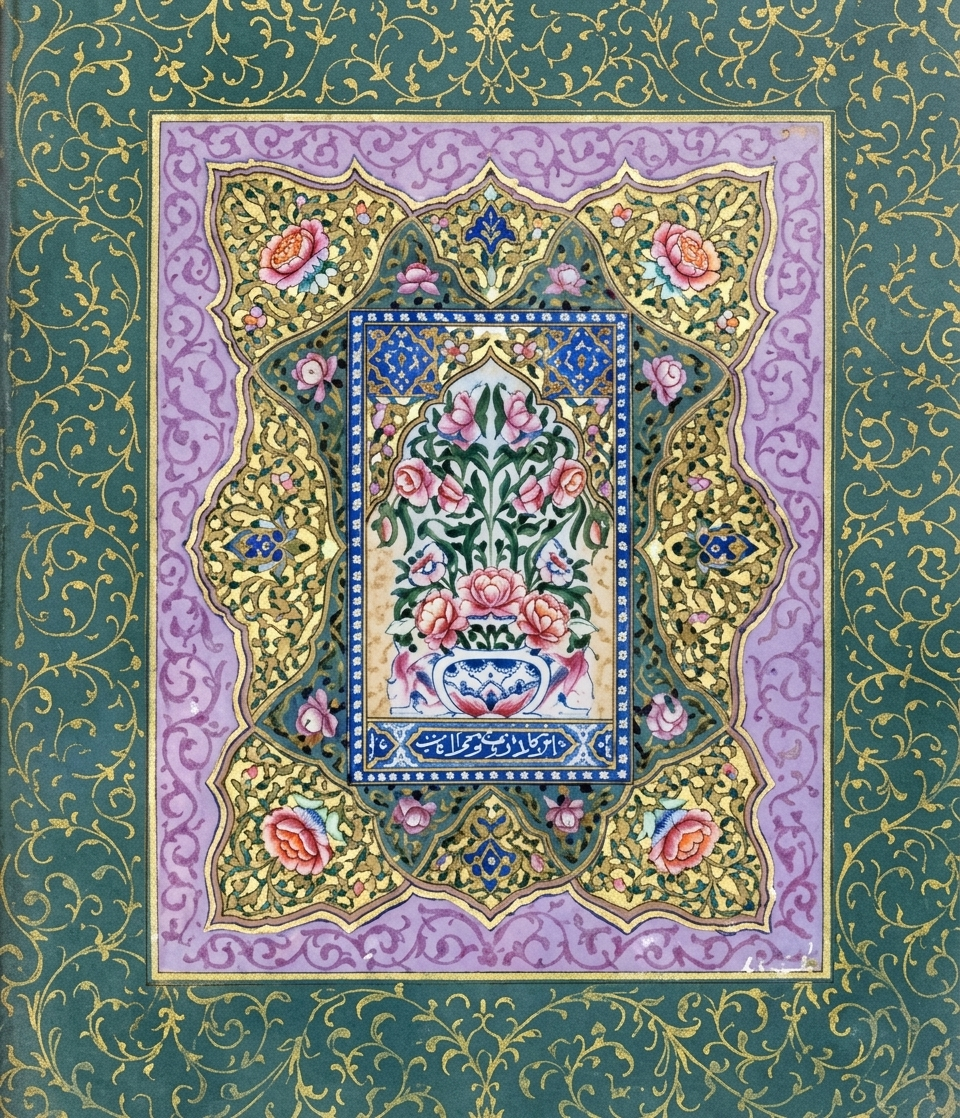
A miniature by Mohamed Ranem

In February 1948, a report on Algerian artists, written with a view to future appointments at the National School of Fine Arts of Algiers, presented Mohammed Racim as a major figure in the revival of Algerian miniature painting. Ali Ali-Khodja and Mohamed Ranem were cited among his most remarkable and distinguished students.

A year later, once again accompanied by his friend Ali-Khodja, Ranem organised another exhibition at the Franco-Muslim Circle. Their works were presented alongside those of André Casabonne (1922–1950) and Lavoue-Barrière.

In April 1950, Ranem was invited to exhibit once again at the Maison de l'Artisanat in Algiers. The event brought together works by Sauveur Galliéro, Duvalet, Christiane Bertéa, Braun, Bruno Massa, Andréani, Chartron, and André Acquart, as well as works by Algerian artists including Ali-Khodja, Baya, Ranem, and Bachir Yellès. It was held on the occasion of the publication of issue 2 of the literary review Soleil, founded that same year by the writer Jean Sénac.

In the spring of the same year, Ranem, Ali-Khodja, and Bachir Yellès participated in the 47th Salon of the Society of Algerian and Orientalist Artists.

== Exhibitions in Paris ==
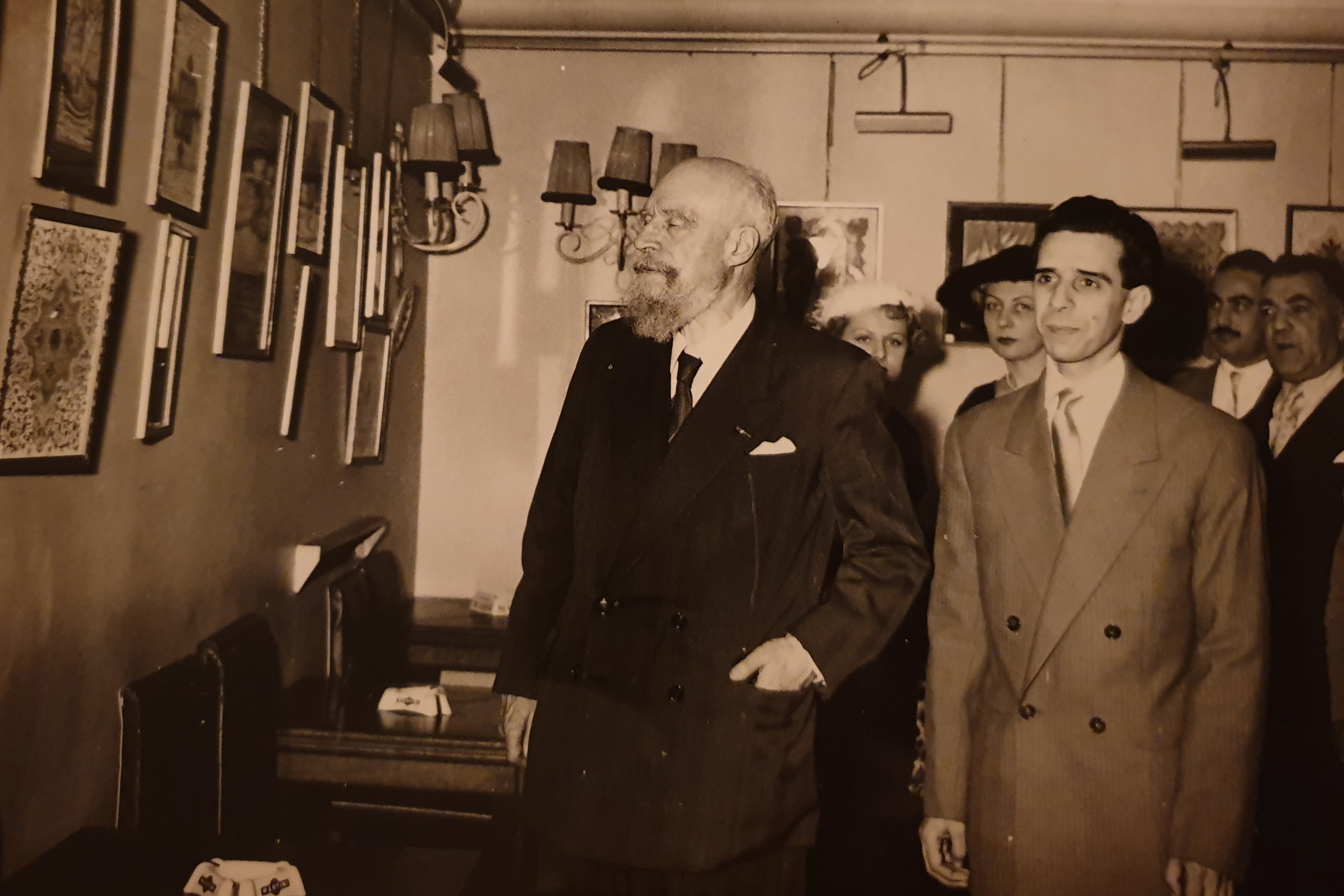
Ranem at an exhibition

In September 1945, Mohamed Ranem made his first known artistic visit to Paris. He presented illuminations and miniatures at a fair devoted to Algerian crafts. In 1950, he exhibited at the Galerie Bernheim-Jeune in Paris. In June 1953, Ranem exhibited at the gallery of the Algerian Office for Economic and Tourist Action of the General Government of Algeria (OFALAC), at 28 Avenue de l'Opéra in Paris. This event is regarded as his first solo exhibition in Paris. Visitors included the painter Miloud Boukerche, a former student of Étienne Dinet, the writer Gabriel Audisio, and the composer Mohamed Iguerbouchène. During this period, Ranem also received a commission to create a mural for the interior of the oriental restaurant Le Hoggar, in the Latin Quarter.

In October 1954, he exhibited at the Cercle de la France d'outre-mer in Paris. In November 1955, he presented another exhibition there. The latter was a solo exhibition. The following year, the Leleu gallery organised an exhibition devoted to several Algerian painters, including Benaboura, Boid, Kader Ben Abdel-Kader, Ranem, and Haminoumna. Beginning on 15 November 1959, Ranem exhibited for the third time at the OFALAC gallery. That same year, he entered the Grand Artistic Prize of Algeria with three works: two illuminations, Surah of the Blood Clot and Surah of Saturn, as well as a miniature, Algiers Festival. Benaboura had received the prize the previous year, and several Algerians had been encouraged by this success. From 13 to 31 December 1968, Ranem again exhibited at the Galerie Bernheim-Jeune in Paris.

== Teaching and the post-independence period ==
In 1960, with the constant support of his master Mohammed Racim, Mohamed Ranem obtained a teaching position at the School of Fine Arts of Algiers, where he succeeded Omar Racim after the latter's death. After Algeria’s independence, Mohamed Ranem also participated in the structuring of the national artistic life. He was associated with the creation of the National Union of Plastic Arts (UNAP), founded in 1963, alongside other prominent Algerian artists. The aim of this organization was to bring together Algerian visual artists, promote national artistic creation, and support the preservation of the various forms of expression of Algerian art, particularly Algerian miniature painting and illumination, to which Ranem devoted a significant part of his artistic career.This appointment brought him back as a teacher to the institution where he had begun his artistic training approximately twenty-one years earlier.

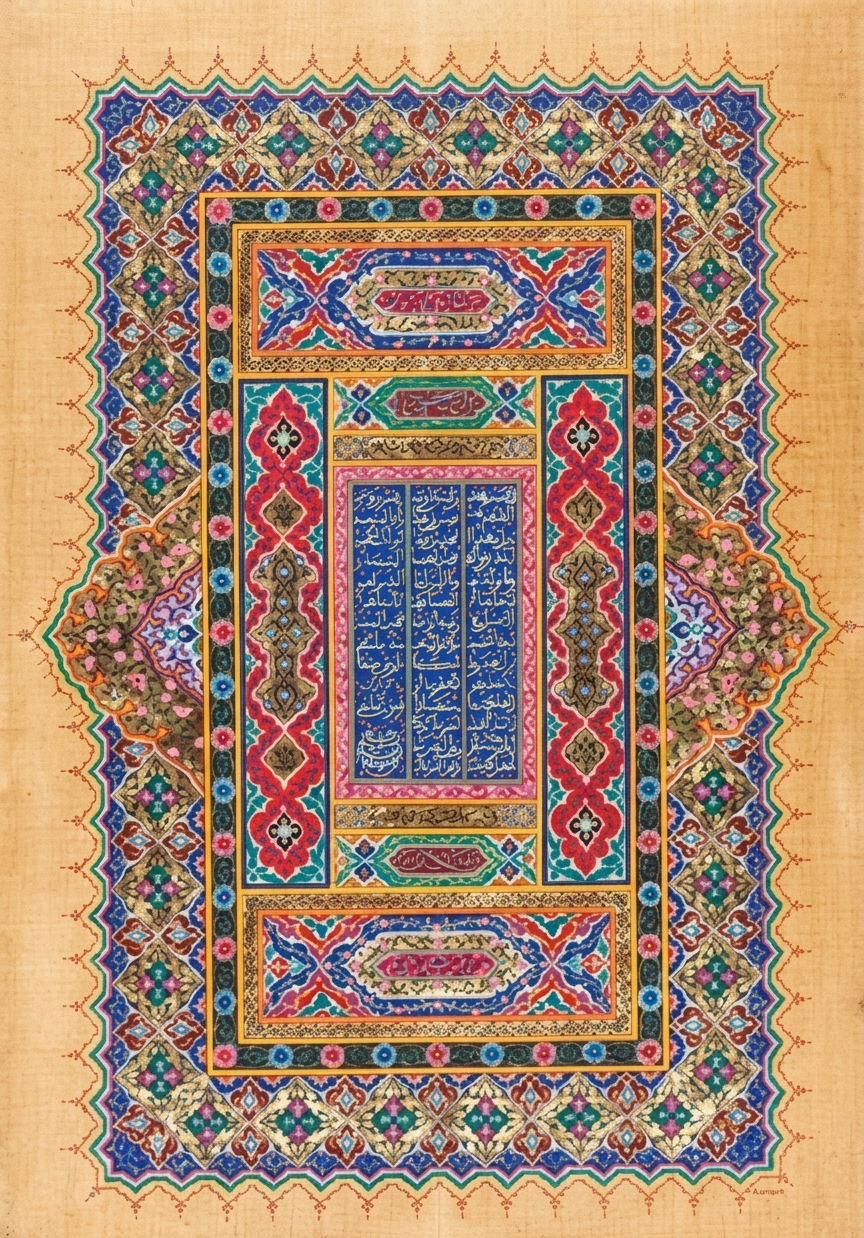
Illuminated Quran page, Surah Al-Balad miniature

However, despite an artistic career marked by success, at the exhibition of 1 November 1963, organised at the Ibn Khaldoun Hall under the auspices of the National Museum of Fine Arts of Algiers (then directed by Jean de Maisonseul), Mohammed Racim was the only artist representing Algerian miniature painting.

This period saw a transformation of arts in Algeria after Algerian independence. Modern painting and debates concerning the renewal of artistic forms gradually assumed a greater place, sometimes to the detriment of the traditional techniques of miniature painting and illumination.

Pioneering artists of the 1940s and 1950s such as Mohamed Ranem suffered from ideological divisions and the emergence of the Painters of the sign, which had a rather restrictive outlook, but nevertheless continued to express themselves in the solitude of their studios and within their group; their works nonetheless appeared in public collections as works of art and remained sought after.

His participation in the exhibition Algerian Painters, presented at the Musée des Arts Décoratifs in Paris from 15 to 30 April 1964, continued a project conceived by Jean Sénac in Algiers after independence. The Paris exhibition was organised by the Algeria–France association with the participation of Algerian institutions.

In 1974, Ranem was among the Algerian artists participating in a group exhibition in Ankara, Turkey of works representative of Algerian painting. This event is documented by a catalogue titled La peinture algérienne: Turquie 1974.

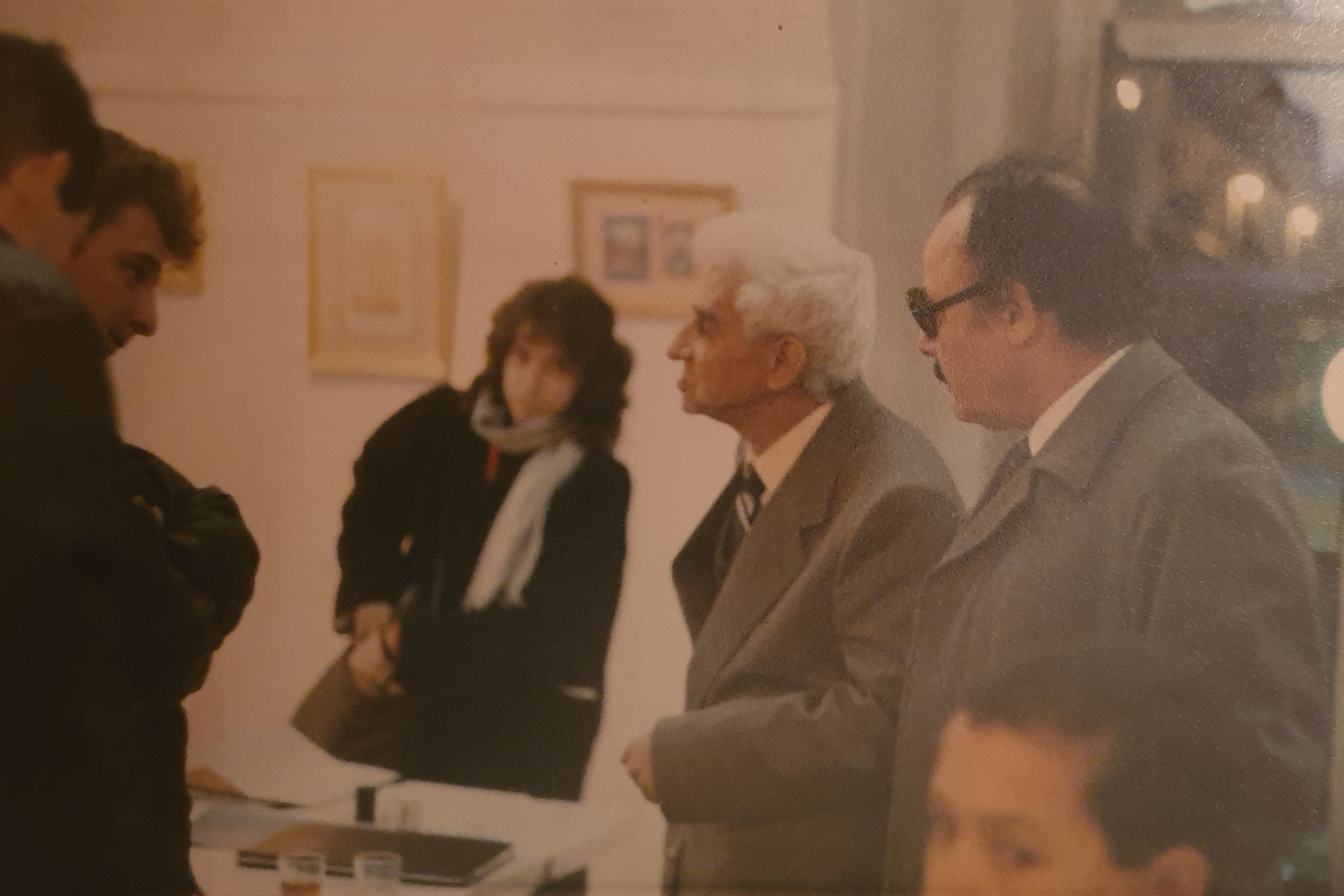
Ranem at an exhibition

After the deaths of Mohammed Racim and Haminoumna in 1975, miniature painting and illumination became more closely associated with traditional arts and crafts, while continuing to be taught in art schools alongside, notably, calligraphy.

From the 1990s onward, and even more so during the 2000s, several trends in Algerian art renewed their engagement with references drawn from the country's cultural heritage and artistic legacies. Miniature painting and illumination continued to be practised and reinterpreted in contemporary works using ancient motifs, scripts, and themes.

== Exhibitions ==
- 1943: first exhibition at the Baconnier bookshop, Algiers.
- September 1945: exhibition of illuminations and miniatures at the Algerian crafts fair, Paris.
- 15–31 December 1947: exhibition at the Maison de l'Artisanat, Algiers.
- 1949: exhibition at the Franco-Muslim Circle, Algiers.
- 1950: exhibition at the Galerie Bernheim-Jeune, Paris.
- 15–30 June 1953: exhibition at the gallery of the Algerian Office for Economic and Tourist Action (OFALAC), Paris.
- October 1954: exhibition at the Cercle de la France d'outre-mer, Paris.
- 2–15 November 1955: exhibition at the Cercle de la France d'outre-mer, Paris.
- 15–30 November 1959: exhibition at the OFALAC gallery, Paris.
- 2 March 1965: exhibition at the Franco-Muslim Circle, Algiers.
- 21 May–6 June 1965: exhibition at the gallery of the UNAP, Algiers.
- 21 May–6 June 1967: exhibition at the gallery of the UNAP, Algiers.
- 13–31 December 1968: exhibition at the Galerie Bernheim-Jeune, Paris.
- 10–30 November 1971: exhibition at the Feraoun gallery, Algiers.
- 28 October–11 November 1972: exhibition at the gallery of the UNAP, Algiers.
- October 1974: exhibition at the gallery of the UNAP, Algiers.
- 1–6 October 1975: exhibition at the Feraoun gallery, Algiers.
- 6–17 September 1978: exhibition at the gallery of the UNAP, Algiers.
- 14–25 July 1982: exhibition at the Feraoun gallery, Algiers.
- 16–30 June 1983: exhibition at the Feraoun gallery, Algiers.
- January–February 1984: exhibition at the Feraoun gallery, Algiers.
- 9–25 June 1990: exhibition at the Racim gallery, Algiers.
- February 1993: exhibition at the Cultural Centre of the Wilaya of Algiers (CCWA), Algiers.
- 28 September 1994: exhibition at the Racim gallery, Algiers.

== Awards and honours ==
- 1940 – Awarded first prize in bookbinding at the School of Fine Arts of Algiers.
- 1941 – Awarded first prize in illumination and first prize in ceramics.
- 1942 – Received the Prix de la Ville d'Alger (Prize of the City of Algiers).
- 1959 – Participated in the Grand Prix Artistique de l’Algérie with three works.
- 1960 – Appointed professor of miniature painting and illumination at the École des Beaux-Arts d’Alger, succeeding his teacher Omar Racim.
- 2011 – Honoured as one of the major figures of Algerian miniature painting during the exhibition Ranem et ses élèves held at the Palais des Raïs in Algiers.

== Bibliography ==
- Mansour Abrous (2006). Dictionnaire des artistes algériens: 1917–2006 (in French). Paris: L'Harmattan. p. 242. ISBN 978-2-296-01690-3.
- Élisabeth Cazenave (2010). Les artistes de l'Algérie: Dictionnaire des peintres, sculpteurs, graveurs, 1830–1962 (in French). Éditions de l'Onde. p. 447. ISBN 978-2-916929-27-9.
- Jean Sénac (2002). Visages d'Algérie : regards sur l'art (in French). Paris: Paris-Méditerranée.
- Alain Messaoudi (2018). "Au croisement des cultures savantes et des cultures populaires : Baya et l'art des autodidactes dans le Maghreb des années 1945-1960". Une histoire sociale et culturelle du politique en Algérie (in French). Paris: Éditions de la Sorbonne. pp. 277–294. doi:10.4000/books.psorbonne.55597.
