= Ozarovsky =

Ozarovsky (Russian: Озаровский; masculine) or Ozarovskaya (Озаровская; feminine) is a Russian last name, a variant of Azarov. Despite sounding similar to the Russian word "озарение" (ozareniye, meaning enlightenment), this last name is unrelated to it.

People with the last name

- Olga Ozarovskaya, Russian folklore performer whose works were illustrated by Leonid Khizhinsky
