= Ali Ali-Khodja =

Algerian painter and miniaturist (1923–2010)

- علي علي خوجة
- Ali-Khodja, c. 1970
- Born: January 13, 1923; Bologhine (then Saint-Eugène), Algiers, French Algeria
- Died: February 7, 2010 (aged 87); El Biar, Algiers, Algeria
- Known for: Painting, miniature, illumination, postage stamp and poster design
- Relatives: Mohammed Racim (uncle); Omar Racim (uncle); Ali Khodja (great-grandfather)
- Awards: Sivry Scholarship (1942); Meilleur Ouvrier de France gold medal (1960); Grand National Painting Prize (1970); National Merit medal (1987)

Ali Ali-Khodja (Arabic: علي علي خوجة; January 13, 1923 – February 7, 2010) was an Algerian painter, miniaturist, illuminator, and graphic designer. Regarded as one of the elder figures of modern Algerian painting, he trained in traditional calligraphy, illumination, and miniature before turning to landscape, watercolor, and, from the 1980s, abstraction. He taught decoration at the École des Beaux-Arts in Algiers until 1994 and designed around thirty Algerian postage stamps, including independent Algeria's first commemorative stamp, as well as the coat of arms of Algiers.

== Early life and training ==
Ali-Khodja was born in Bologhine, in Algiers, into a Kouloughli family descended from the rulers of the Regency of Algiers; he was a great-grandson of the dey Ali Khodja. After his father died in 1927, he was raised by his maternal uncles, the miniaturist Mohammed Racim and the illuminator and calligrapher Omar Racim, who taught him the foundations of miniature, calligraphy, and illumination. He attended school in Saint-Eugène and then El Biar from 1929 to 1937, and in 1937 entered the École des Beaux-Arts in Algiers.

== Career ==
Ali-Khodja first exhibited in a group show in 1941 in Algiers. In 1942 the city of Algiers awarded him the Sivry Scholarship, first prize in its miniature section. In 1945 he became a draftsman in the design office of the Algiers crafts service, and in 1946 he held his first solo exhibition. In 1947 he took part in a touring exhibition in Stockholm, Oslo, and Copenhagen, showing miniatures and illuminations, and in 1950 he exhibited with painters associated with Soleil, the review founded by Jean Sénac. Over his career he also exhibited in Paris, Beijing, Tunis, Rabat, and Granada.

From 1948 to 1961 he headed the Museum of Popular Arts and Traditions in Algiers. He received the gold medal of the Meilleur Ouvrier de France competition in 1960, or 1961 according to some sources. In 1961 he joined the École des Beaux-Arts in Algiers as a professor of decoration, teaching there until 1994 and training several generations of Algerian artists after independence. In 1963 he was a founding member of the Union nationale des arts plastiques (UNAP), and he took part in the first exhibitions held in independent Algeria. Several of his works were shown at the first Pan-African Cultural Festival in Algiers in 1969. He received the Grand National Painting Prize in 1970 and the National Merit medal in 1987.

== Work ==
Ali-Khodja began as a miniaturist and ceramist before turning to oil painting. From 1943 to 1950 he worked almost exclusively in miniature, depicting daily life in old Algiers. After 1962 he painted landscapes of the Sahel region around Algiers, moved toward watercolor in the early 1970s, and produced a series on animals between 1974 and 1977 before experimenting with engraving. From the 1980s he worked mainly in abstraction, on canvas as well as copper and gold; works from this period include Chemin spatial et diffraction (1984), Fusion and Scintillement (1986).

He also worked extensively in the applied arts, and is counted among the major Algerian artists who designed postage stamps. He produced one of the first designs for a national stamp of independent Algeria, and designed around thirty stamps in all, among them Algeria's first commemorative stamp, issued on July 5, 1963 for the first anniversary of independence, and the 1964 stamp marking the Algiers–Annaba microwave link. Bessalah describes him as a leading figure of Algerian philately whose stamps pair documentary accuracy with a palette and draftsmanship that celebrate the richness of the country's cultural heritage. In 1965 he created the coat of arms of Algiers. His posters include work for the Ministry of Tourism (1968) and the Algiers International Fair (1974), and in 1972 he won first prize for the poster marking the tenth anniversary of independence.

Despite a public career spanning more than six decades, he was known for his reticence toward the media and held only seven solo exhibitions.
