= Léon Carré =

French painter

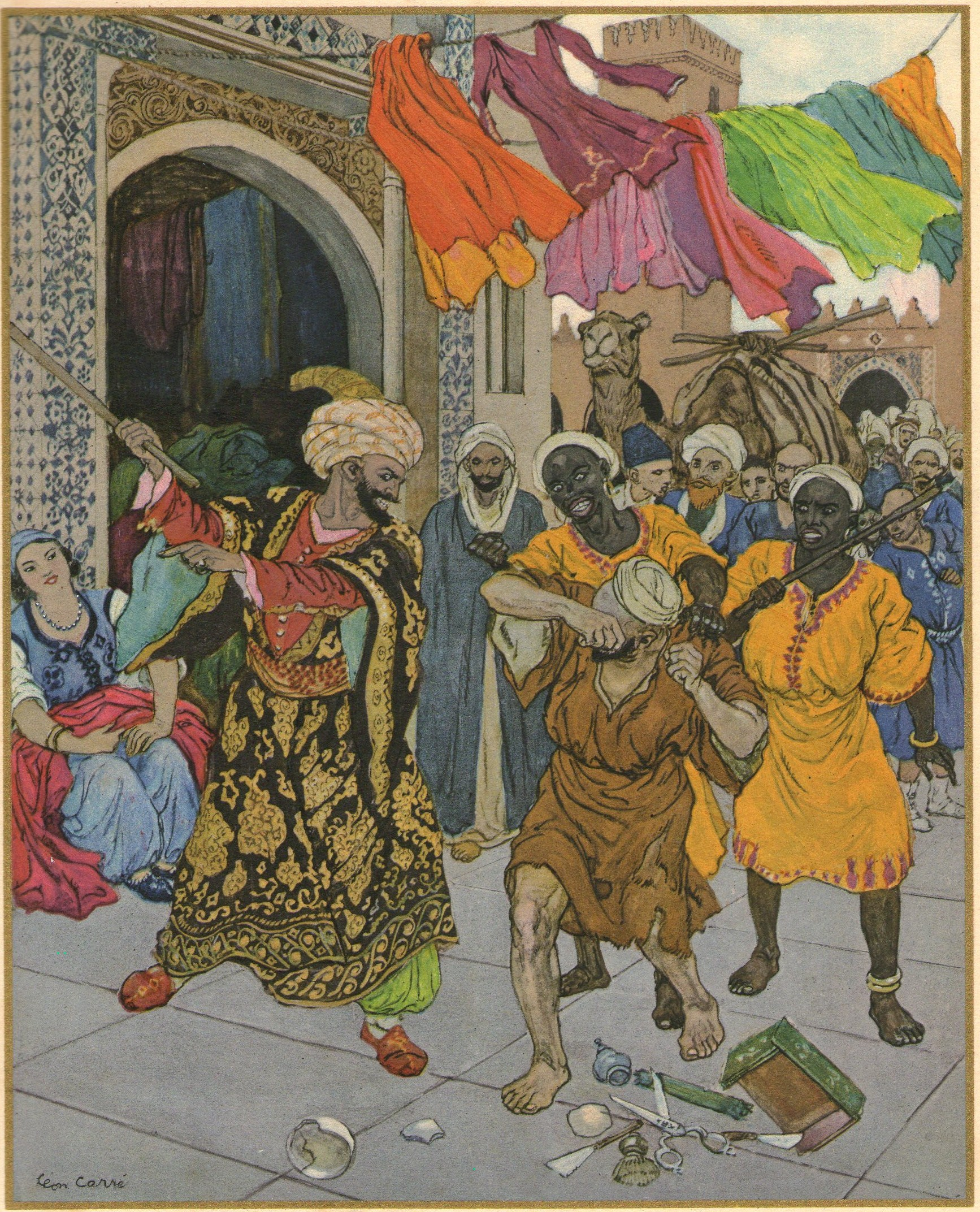
- Illustration from 1001 Nights by Leon Carré
- Born: Léon Georges Jean-Baptiste Carré; 1878; Granville, Manche, France
- Died: 2 December 1942 (aged 63–64); Rue Dumont-d'Urville, Algiers, French Algeria
- Known for: Illustrations
- Notable work: Illustrator, The Book of One Thousand and One Nights), 1929 by J. C. Mardrus
- Movement: Orientalist
- Spouse: Anne Marie "Ketty" Lederer (1882–1964)
- Awards: Knight of the Legion of Honor (1936)

Léon Georges Jean-Baptiste Carré (French: [leɔ̃ kaʁe]; 23 June 1878 – 2 December 1942) was a French Orientalist painter and illustrator, noted for illustrating the book, The Book of One Thousand and One Nights.

== Life and career ==
Carré was born in Granville, Manche, of Norman ancestry. He showed an early talent for drawing. He studied in Rennes under Mathurin Méheut. At the age of 19 years, he left Brittany with a good job as a decorator and in Paris studied with Leon Bonnat and Luc-Olivier Merson. He exhibited at the French Salon des Artistes in 1900; at the Salon des Independents in 1905; the Salon de la Société Nationale des Beaux-Arts in 1907 and the Salon d'Automne in 1911. He was the winner of the Abd-el-Tif prize and a two-time winner of the Chenavard Prize. He primarily worked in oil, gouache and pastel. Among his works are illustrations for the 12-volume edition of Le livre des mille nuits et une nuit (The Book of One Thousand and One Nights) by J. C. Mardrus. One of his works, The Ruins of El Djem Amphitheatre, Tunisia is on the French 50 franc bank note.

Carré began his artistic career painting scenes of Parisian street life. He travelled to Algiers in 1905. One of his first Orientalist works, the Arab Market (Marché Arabé) earned him the Prix Chevanard (Chevanard Prize) in 1905.

After marrying the painter, Anne Marie "Ketty" Lederer (1882–1964), the couple set up a villa at Abd-el-Tif where a number of Oriental artists were already established. During the Abd-el-Tif period, Carré made many drawings of Orientalist scenes; The Gypsies of Granada, The Jews of Morocco, The Courtesans of Biskra, The Arab in Prayer and The Woman with the Tambourine. He won the Abd-el-Tif prize in 1909. Later, Carré and his wife moved to Algiers permanently. Carré travelled extensively moving as far south as Biskra and spending most of 1911 in Spain while his wife pursued independent projects.

In 1921, with the painters Louis Ferdinand Antoni and Marius de Buzon, he decorated the new halls of the Palais d'Eté, designed tourist posters, models of postage stamps for the Bank of Algeria. In 1927, he contributed to the decoration of the liner "Ile-de-France".

He was made a Knight of the Legion of Honor in 1936.

Carré died in Algiers on 2 December 1942 at his studio in the rue Dumont-d'Urville, Algiers where he had been living since the war and where he was surrounded by his paintings and those of his wife.

== Work ==
Select list of paintings

- The Coastal, 1903
- The Arab Market,1905
- Corrida de Toros, [The Bullfight] 1911
- The Gitanes of Granada, [Gypsies of Granada] c. 1911
- "The Jews of Morocco, 1909-1911
- The Courtesans of Biskra, 1909-1911
- The Arab in Prayer, 1909-1911
- The Woman with the Tambourine, 1909-1911
- Pastoral, 1913

== See also ==
- List of Orientalist artists
- Orientalism
