= Elizabeth Marsh =

English writer (1735–1785)

- Born: Elizabeth Marsh; 1735; Portsmouth, England
- Died: 1785 (aged 49–50); Calcutta, British India
- Occupations: Writer; traveler; captive
- Era: Georgian Era
- Known for: Letters on Captivity, The Female Captive: A Narrative of Facts, Which Happened in Barbary, in the Year 1756. ... Written by Herself
- Spouse: James Crisp (m. December 1756 – 7 January 1757)

Elizabeth Marsh (1735–1785) was an Englishwoman who was held captive in Morocco for a brief period after the ship she was traveling from Gibraltar to England to unite with her fiancé was intercepted by a Moroccan corsair and overtaken by its crew.

Marsh wrote The Female Captive: A Narrative of Fact Which Happened in Barbary in the Year 1756, Written by Herself, which was published more than a decade after her return from captivity. It documents her misfortunes after she and her shipmates were captured by Moroccan sailors, and was the first captive barbary narrative written in English by a woman author. In the published version, Marsh added quite a few details that helped reframe her narrative in a more novelistic form and that heightened the sense of danger she felt as well as created dramatic tension around the question of whether or not she would escape. Marsh's narrative is an important contributor to the larger genre of European women's captivity narratives, which frequently featured female resistance to captivity and sexual violence.

== Captivity ==
Marsh moved to Gibraltar to board a ship on 28 July 1756, intending to join her fiancé back home and marry him. After the Ann was "unhappily deserted" by the Gosport, it was easily taken on 8 August by a Moroccan corsair of about 20 guns and 130 seamen, then carried to Salé. The captives were "conducted" to Marrakech and Marsh started to hate the idea of being sexually harassed. She had decided to disguise herself as the wife of a James Crisp, a merchant from London, in her narrative of the story. However, he is actually the ship's captain in the letters he sent out. After being presented to the Prince Sidi Mohammed, everything went downhill for Marsh. She was importuned to be the Prince's concubine, tricked into renouncing her Christianity and converting to Islam, and almost beaten into submission. After four months and with resumed peace talks with Morocco, Marsh gained her coveted liberty and returned home.

=== Manipulation as a survival tactic of female slave captives ===
Marsh does not often show how she feels in her captive narrative, The Female Captive, about what is happening to her at the time she is being held captive. However, she does make sure to show the very little interest that she has in doing anything that the Prince Sidi Mohammed asks her to do. She repeatedly says she would prefer death to doing any sexual favors being asked. People judge her for using manipulation in her narrative, even if she used them for her own survival. Marsh uses the powerful dependent tactic, the constant victim tactic, and the multiple offender tactic to help her survive as a captive. In The Female Captive it is said, "Despairing of cowing his hostage into submission, the Prince grudgingly granted her freedom and permission to leave the country, yet not before Britain formally agreed to resume peace talks with Morocco." This statement shows the powerful dependent tactic coming into play. The rest of the narrative gives many examples of Marsh using manipulation for her own survival.

Despite Marsh's position as an enslaved woman, she still holds power over her fellow white male captives, since whenever she desires an accommodation, she receives one. Her narrative is marked by her ability to evade the humiliating conditions and hard labor the male captives endured and, rather, how she was treated with care, and leisurely made her way through her time spent as a captive. Marsh had a dichotomous, paradoxical enslavement, in that she was technically a captive, yet was not enslaved the way the men were. She was never given duties as harsh as those of the men, and could skew a situation in her favor by highlighting the fact that she was a woman. Marsh's complaints throughout the narrative can be read as reminders to those around her that she knew how she would be treated, thus implying that she understood her placement in the hierarchy of power among captives and used it to her advantage. When she needed the passivity to work in her favor, she did so to remain innocent and chaste, and when she needed the agency to get what she wanted, she did so in defiance and entitlement. Contrary to the males, female captives seemed to be given a chance to travel, self-reliance and assertiveness, and non-domestic work opportunities. The Female Captive is a testament to how women in captivity narratives, particularly Marsh, used their femininity and sexuality to their benefit in order to bypass situations and pad their position. The book provides an alternative lens on the traditional, male slave tales.

=== Concubinage ===
Slavery was a part of Arab culture before the Qur’an. It was a part of society that contributed to the financial stability and day-to-day lives of many people throughout the Arab world. While slavery was an accepted practice from the beginning, the idea of concubines was based more on individual interpretations of the Qur'an. Only slaves could become concubines, which led to the practice of enslaving women from other cultures for that purpose. While popular culture spread the idea of the harem to the Western world, the practice was largely confined to the wealthy. The practicalities of taking care of a large number of women were too much for the everyday man of the time to even consider.

The term "harem" referred not only to wives and concubines, but all other female members of the household, including children and domestic slaves. Screened from male view, the harem became a source of mystery and rumor for Europeans. This was enhanced due to the fact that male writers, many of whom purported to have knowledge of the harem, gave hugely exaggerated accounts. Thomas Pellow, who was enslaved for 23 years in Morocco, claimed that the harem of Moulay Ismail had eight thousand wives living in it. While European narratives about harems were largely exaggerated accounts given by men who had no access to them, evidence exists that points to abuse, poisonings, and women being sold when they started aging or their appearance started to decline.

== Life after captivity ==
Elizabeth Marsh faced scrutiny after returning home after her captivity. She stated in the author's note of The Female Captive, "Though I have unhappily seldom experienced those Hours [of Ease and Tranquility], who may say, with too much Truth, that the Misfortunes I met with in Barbary have been more equalled by those I have since experienced, in this Land of Civil and Religious Liberty."

Suspicion arose regarding the maintenance of her chastity while in captivity due to her many visits with the sultan. At the time, influential members of European society believed that women could be easily persuaded to undertake various actions thanks to the exotic allure of the Orient. These ideas were encouraged by the publication of a translated version of The Arabian Nights by French orientalist Antoine Galland (an English version of the book was first published in 1795, although French copies were available to Marsh).

=== Problems with publishing ===
Even though almost two-thirds of all slaves brought into the Islamic world were female, female captive narratives were scrutinized more than captive narratives written by men. The argument against the legitimacy of captive narratives by women was rooted in the presumably-inherent feminine weakness that was believed to prevent women from resisting the opulence of the Orient. Marsh faced this criticism when she returned home, preventing her from publishing her narrative due to fear of the backlash it would cause. Even with her aforementioned display of strength when faced with Sultan Sidi Mohammad Ben Abdallah's offer of concubinage, she was accused of being a liar and giving up her virtue to him.

=== Post-traumatic stress disorder ===
Marsh displayed multiple symptoms of post-traumatic stress disorder. She exhibited loneliness, emotional detachment from herself and those around her, and distrust. Telling her story was a way for Marsh to digest what had happened to her and how to cope with it, even if she was pressured into writing about it.

Post-traumatic stress disorder is a key part of understanding why Marsh wrote her story. Some critics of these slave narratives claim that what she wrote was not the truth. Any manipulation of her story might indicate that she was focusing on handling PTSD without even being aware it was happening. The awareness of mental disorders and disease is a new area of health that has only started to come to light in recent years. For a woman to branch out and write about her traumatic experiences was unusual.

=== Impact of captivity ===
After her captivity, Marsh married James Crisp, the man that she had pretended to be married to while a slave. She had done so in the hopes that she would not be assaulted by the other men she was traveling with. This succeeded, but the validity of her marriage was called into question after her release. After insistence from her parents, Marsh married Crisp and had two children with him.

Marsh's life took a turn when she left from her family for 18 months. It could be argued that Marsh did this as a result of her time in captivity and was making an attempt to live life independently.

The largest impact that Marsh's captivity had on herself was likely the production and publication of her narrative. Though it was originally published anonymously, word traveled that she was the author. Her narrative became one of the most consumed female slavery narratives as well as one of the few to withstand time.

== Additional reading ==
- Colley, Linda (2007). "One life reveals a global history". RSA Journal. 154 (5531): 38–43. JSTOR 41380537.
- Hanna, Mark G. (2015). Pirate Nests and the Rise of the British Empire, 1570–1740. UNC Press Books. ISBN 978-1-4696-1795-4. JSTOR 10.5149/9781469617954_hanna.
- www.jjhc.info Family history website showing links to relatives
