= Mohamed Racim Art Gallery =

Mohamed Racim Gallery
- رواق محمد راسم
- Portrait of Mohamed Racim (1896–1975)

- Location in Algiers
- Established: 1987
- Location: 7 Avenue Pasteur, Algiers-Centre, Algiers, Algeria
- Coordinates: 36.770105°N 3.055379°E
- Type: Art gallery

The Mohamed Racim Gallery (Arabic: رواق محمد راسم) is an Algerian visual arts art gallery in Algiers, named after painter and miniaturist Mohamed Racim.

The gallery was inaugurated in 1963 by the Algerian Ministry of Culture to promote contemporary Algerian artists. It regularly hosts temporary exhibitions, retrospectives, and cultural events showcasing visual arts in Algeria.

The Mohamed Racim Gallery organizes temporary exhibitions by Algerian and foreign visual artists, tributes to major figures of Algerian art, alongside educational and artistic awareness programs. It also serves as a meeting place for artists, researchers, and art enthusiasts, playing a central role in the cultural scene of Algiers.

== Notable exhibitions ==
Several major events have taken place at the Mohamed Racim Gallery:

- 2019: Allégorie exhibition by Taïeb Benabbas Bakhti, organized by the gallery.
- 2023: Participation in the Korean Week in Algiers, organized by the South Korean Embassy and the Ministry of Culture.
- 2024: Treasures of Orientalist Painting exhibition, featuring works inspired by Algerian pictorial traditions.
- 2024: Collective exhibition Mostaganem en panorama, highlighting the heritage and artists of Mostaganem.
- 2024: Solo exhibition by Fayçal Barkat, described by critics as “authentic and luminous.”

== See also ==
- Mohamed Racim
- National Museum of Fine Arts of Algiers
- Algerian culture
