= Mark Kirnarsky =

Mark Abramovich Kirnarsky (June 8, 1893 in Pogar – 1941 in Leningrad, now Saint Petersburg) was a Soviet cover artist of Jewish descent. He belonged to the so-called Petrograd school, distinguished by consistent and scrupulous style. He scored particularly for Akhmatova's From Six Books (Iz shesti knig) and the publishing house Academia.

Since 1922 Kirnarsky lived in Leningrad and died during its siege.
