= Azarovo =

Azarovo (Russian: Азарово) is the name of several rural localities in Russia.

== Modern localities ==
- Azarovo, Bryansk Oblast, a village in Setolovsky Rural Administrative Okrug of Pochepsky District in Bryansk Oblast; 53°1′N 33°32′E
- Azarovo, Maloyaroslavetsky District, Kaluga Oblast, a village in Maloyaroslavetsky District of Kaluga Oblast
- Azarovo, Zhukovsky District, Kaluga Oblast, a village in Zhukovsky District of Kaluga Oblast
- Azarovo, Kursk Oblast, a village in Azarovsky Selsoviet of Kastorensky District in Kursk Oblast
- Azarovo, Oryol Oblast, a village in Voinsky Selsoviet of Mtsensky District in Oryol Oblast
- Azarovo, Kardymovsky District, Smolensk Oblast, a village in Molkovskoye Rural Settlement of Kardymovsky District in Smolensk Oblast
- Azarovo, Novoduginsky District, Smolensk Oblast, a village in Dneprovskoye Rural Settlement of Novoduginsky District in Smolensk Oblast
- Azarovo, Sychyovsky District, Smolensk Oblast, a village in Varaksinskoye Rural Settlement of Sychyovsky District in Smolensk Oblast
- Azarovo, Belsky District, Tver Oblast, a village in Demyakhovskoye Rural Settlement of Belsky District in Tver Oblast
- Azarovo, Privolzhskoye Rural Settlement, Kimrsky District, Tver Oblast, a village in Privolzhskoye Rural Settlement of Kimrsky District in Tver Oblast
- Azarovo, Tsentralnoye Rural Settlement, Kimrsky District, Tver Oblast, a village in Tsentralnoye Rural Settlement of Kimrsky District in Tver Oblast
- Azarovo, Rzhevsky District, Tver Oblast, a village in Chertolino Rural Settlement of Rzhevsky District in Tver Oblast

== Alternative names ==
- Azarovo, alternative name of Azarova, a village in Boshinsky Rural Administrative Okrug of Karachevsky District in Bryansk Oblast; 52°56′N 34°57′E

== See also ==
- Azarov, Russian last name
