= The Book of the Thousand Nights and One Night (1923) =

The Book of the Thousand Nights and One Night is a 1923 novel by Edward Powys Mathers and J. C. Mardrus.

== Plot summary ==
The Book of the Thousand Nights and One Night is a novel in which a layered collection of over four hundred interwoven tales are framed by the story of Scheherazade, who tells nightly stories to King Shahrayar to delay her execution. The work unfolds as a nested narrative—stories within stories—ranging from well-known adventures like Aladdin and Sinbad to more obscure tales. The collection still offers a vast spectrum of literary elements: fantasy, intrigue, humor, and philosophical depth. The stories span from simple fables to complex narratives.

== Publication history ==
The Thousand Nights and One Night was translated by Mardrus and Mathers and published in four volumes by Routledge & Kegan Paul.

== Reception ==
Wendy Graham reviewed The Thousand Nights and One Night for Adventurer magazine and stated that "I kept promising myself I'd stop when I reached the end of the book I was on. I kept on reading to the end. Whatever you want from a book you can find in the Nights - from dreams and fantasies to big-bestseller intrigues, crude humour and not-so-crude, simple stories side by side with tales of Borgesian complexity and resonance. If you think you know the stories already, you are in for a big surprise. Kings and princes and towers, battles and djinni and houris, fables and histories and legends: the whole adding up to more than the sum of its parts. I unreservedly recommend it."

== Reviews ==
- Review by Ira Glass and Mary Zimmerman (1999) in This American Life, February 12, 1999
