= Azarov =

Azarov (Russian: Азаров; masculine) or Azarova (Азарова; feminine) is a Russian patronymic surname derived from the given name Azary. Notable people with the surname include:

- Mykola Azarov (b. 1947), Ukrainian politician, 14th Prime Minister of Ukraine
- Nadezhda Azarova (b. 1983), Belarusian chess player
- Sergei Azarov (b. 1983), Belarusian chess player
- Svitlana Azarova (b. 1976), Ukrainian/Dutch composer of contemporary classical music
- Tatyana Azarova (b. 1985), Kazakhstani athlete
- Vasili Azarov, Russian footballer
- Vladimir Azarov (b. 1994), Russian association football player
- Yelena Azarova (b. 1973), Russian synchronized swimmer

== Fictional characters ==
- Shurochka Azarova, cavalry maiden in the 1962 Soviet musical Hussar Ballad
- Nina Azarova, character from Netflix series The OA

== See also ==
- Azarovo, several rural localities in Russia
