= Academia (Soviet publishing house) =

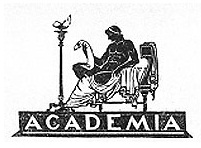
- Academia logo
- Status: Defunct
- Defunct: 1937
- Successor: Goslitizdat
- Country of origin: Soviet Union
- Publication types: Books

Academia (named after Platonic Academy) was a Soviet publishing house prior to the merger with Goslitizdat. The publishing house employed many prominent Russian graphic artists (Nikolai Akimov, Veniamin Belkin, Leonid Khizhinsky, Vladimir Konashevich, Mark Kirnarsky, Dmitry Mitrokhin, Leo Mülhaupt, Sergei Pozharsky, Pavel Shillingovsky, etc.) and issued over one thousand books during its existence (1922–1937). Academia, in particular, published the first translation of One Thousand and One Nights into Russian directly from the Arabic source, made by Mikhail Salye.

== History ==
Academia was founded as a private publishing house at the Petrograd University. It came under the control of Soviet State Institute of Arts’ History shortly thereafter and was reformed to a state publishing joint-stock company. The 1922 edition of The Works of Plato was the first to bear Academia’s logo. There are four known alterations of Academia logo (all by Grigory Lyubarsky), which differ by house’s name placement. In 1929 the publishing house was transferred from Leningrad to Moscow, and the woodcut artists were employed (Vladimir Favorsky, Andrey Goncharov, Aleksei Kravchenko, Mikhail Pikov, Nikolai Piskarev, Mikhail Polyakov, and Georgy Yecheistov).

Academia failed to finalize the publication of some books. Several books, such as Michel de Montaigne's Essais, Demosthenes' Orations, Plutarch's Parallel Lives, Tacitus' Annals or the Divine Comedy, remained unpublished. Additionally, the issuing of the declared 5,300 copies (1935, 492 pages) of Demons by Fyodor Dostoyevsky was cancelled. Only a few examples, that turned a bibliophilic rarity, are known. The last head of Academia was Lev Kamenev. In 1938–1939 Goslitizdat issued several books, marked with "the book was compiled by the publishing house Academia" ("книга подготовлена издательством "Academia").

== Some authors published ==
- Apuleius
- Aristotle
- Aristophanes
- Tommaso Campanella
- Catullus
- Dante Alighieri
- Honoré de Balzac
- Pierre Beaumarchais
- Giovanni Boccaccio
- George Gordon Byron
- Daniel Defoe
- Charles Dickens
- Denis Diderot
- Fyodor Dostoyevsky
- Alexandre Dumas, père
- Johann Wolfgang von Goethe
- Vincent van Gogh
- Carlo Goldoni
- Grimm Brothers
- Heinrich Heine
- Heliodorus of Emesa
- Homer
- Horatius
- Ibn Hazm
- Virgil
