= Le Livre des mille nuits et une nuit =

French translation of One Thousand and One Nights

- Original title: Arabic: كتاب ألف ليلة وليلة (Kitāb alf laylah wa-laylah)
- Translator: J. C. Mardrus
- Illustrator: Léon Carré
- Cover artist: Mohammed Racim
- Country: France
- Language: French
- Publisher: L'Edition d'Art H. Piazza
- No. of books: 16

Le Livre des mille nuits et une nuit ('The Book of One Thousand and One Nights') is a French translation of One Thousand and One Nights by J. C. Mardrus. The first edition was published in sixteen volumes in 1899–1904, by the publisher La Reveu blanche.

In this First Edition, the Editors claimed that Mardrus based his translation in the Arabic print editions of Bulaq; with some revision from other editions like Calcutta II, Breslau and some other manuscripts.

== Second Edition ==
The second edition was composed of 12 volumes, 298×228 mm each, were published in 1926–1932 by the Paris publisher L'Edition d'Art H. Piazza. With Morocco leather covers, the book sides were decorated with a gilt-stamped panel with oriental design different for each volume. The volumes were also decorated with gilt fleurons, triple gilt fillet and blind-stamped filet on the inside, as well as red watered silk endleaves.

The volumes feature the illustrations of the French artist Léon Carré and the cover art by Mohammed Racim, with binding work by René Aussourd. Racim spent eight years designing the cover art for the volumes. The volumes also contain the illustrated titles of each tale in Arabic on separate pages, following their French titles. The print run consists of 2,500 numbered copies.

== Translations ==
Mardrus' book proved to be popular and was translated to another languages.It was translated in English by Powys Mathers in 1923 an published by the Casanova Society, in 16 volumes. The first printing was a limited set of 2250 sets. It had the title: The Book of the Thousand Nights and One Night.

== Reception ==
Soviet and Russian scholar Isaak Filshtinsky, however, considered Mardrus' translation inferior to others due to presence of chunks of text, which Mardrus conceived himself to satisfy tastes of his time.

== Contents ==
This list follows the First French Edition in 1899-1904, and also present the names in the English translation by Powys Mathers (1923).

=== Volume 1 ===
- Dédicace de l'œuvre
- Note des éditeurs. (*Note)
- Un mot du traducteur a ses amis
- Dédicace du premier volume -(*Dedication)
- Invocation liminaire .(*Invocation)
- Histoire du roi Schahriar et de son frère le roi Schahzaman (The Tale Of King Shahryar And Of His Brother, King Shahzaman)
  - La fable de l'ane, du boeuf et du maitre de labour (The Fable of the Ass, the Bull and the Husbandman)
- Histoire du marchand avec l'efrit (The Tale Of The Merchant And The Ifrit)
  - Histoire du premier cheikh (The Tale of the First Sheikh)
  - Histoire du deuxième cheikh (The Tale of the Second Sheikh)
  - Histoire du troisième cheikh (The Tale of the Third Sheikh)
- Histoire du pêcheur avec l'efrit (The Fisherman And The Jinni)
  - Histoire du vizir du roi Iounane et du médecin Rouiane (The Tale of the Wazir of King Yunan and Rayyan the Doctor)
    - Le faucon du roi Sindabad (The Tale of King Sindbad and the Falcon)
    - Histoire du prince et de la goule (The Tale of the Prince and the Ogress)
  - Histoire du jeune homme ensorcelé et des poissons (The Tale of the Young Man and the Fishes)
- Du portefaix avec les jeunes filles (The Tale Of The Porter And The Young Girls)
  - Histoire du premier saalouk (Tale of the First Kalandar)
  - Histoire du deuxième saalouk (Tale of the Second Kalandar)
  - Histoire du troisième saalouk (Tale of the Third Kalandar)
  - Histoire de Zobéida (The Tale of Zubaidah, the First of the Girls)
  - Histoire d’Amina (The Tale of the Portress Aminah)
- Histoire de la femme coupée, des trois pommes et du nègre Rihan (The Tale Of The Woman Cut In Pieces, the three apples and the negro Raihan)

=== Volume 2 ===
  - The Tale Of The Wazir Nur Al-Din, his brother the Wazir Shams Al-Din, And Hasan Badr Al-Din
- The Tale Of The Hunchback With The Tailor, The Christian Broker, The Steward And The Jewish Doctor; What Followed After; And The Tales Which Each Of Them Told
  - The Tale of the Christian Broker
  - The Tale of the Steward
  - The Tale of the Jewish Doctor
  - The Tale of the Tailor
    - The Tale Of The Lame Man With The Barber Of Baghdad
    - The tale of the barber of Baghdad and the tales of his six brothers that is to say The Tale of the Barber
      - The Tale of Bakbuk, the Barber’s First Brother
      - The Tale of al-Haddar, the Barber’s Second Brother
      - The Tale of Bakbak, the Barber’s Third Brother
      - The Tale of al-Kaz, the Barber’s Fourth Brother
      - The Tale of al-Ashar, the Barber’s Fifth Brother
      - The Tale of Shakkashik, the Barber’s Sixth Brother
    - The Tale of the Hunchback (continued)
- The Tale Of Sweet-Friend And Ali-Nur
- The Tale Of Ghanim Ibn Ayyub And His Sister Fitnah
  - The Tale of the Negro Sawwab, the First Sudanese Eunuch
  - The Tale of the Negro Kafur, the Second Sudanese Eunuch
  - The Tale of the Negro Bukhait, the Third Sudanese Eunuch
  - The Tale of Ghanim ibn Ayyub (continued)
- The Tale Of King Umar Al-Numan And His Two Remarkable Sons, Sharkan And Dual-Makan
  - The Sayings on the Three Doors
  - The Tale of the Death of King Umar al-Numan and the Admirable Discourses which Went Before it
  - The Discourse of the First Girl
  - The Discourse of the Second Girl
  - The Discourse of the Third Girl
  - The Discourse of the Fourth Girl
  - The Discourse of the Fifth Girl
  - The Discourse of the Old Woman
  - The Tale of the Monastery
  - The Tale of Aziz and Azizah, and of Prince Taj al-Muluk,Crown of Kings
    - The Tale of Aziz and Azizah
    - The Tale of Princess Dunya and Prince Taj al-Muluk
  - The Adventures of Young Kana ma Kana, Son of Dual-Makan
    - The Tale of the Hashish Eater
    - The Tale of Hammad the Badawi
- The Delightful Tale Of The Beasts And Birds
  - The Tale of the Goose, the Peacock and the Peahen
  - The Tale of the Shepherd and the Girl
  - The Tale of the Tortoise and the Heron
  - The Tale of the Wolf and the Fox
  - The Tale of the Mouse and the Weasel
  - The Tale of the Crow and the Civet
  - The Tale of the Crow and the Fox
- The Tale Of Ali Ibn Bakr And The Fair Shams Al-Nahar
- The tale of Kamar al-Zaman and the princess Budur, Moon of moons
- The tale of Happy-handsome and Happy-fair
- The tale of Ala al-Din Abu Shamat
- The tale of sympathy the learned
- An adventure of the poet Abu Nuwas
- The tale of Sinbad the sailor
  - The First Voyage of Sindbad the Sailor
  - The Second Voyage of Sindbad the Sailor
  - The Third Voyage of Sindbad the Sailor
  - The Fourth Voyage of Sindbad the Sailor
  - The Fifth Voyage of Sindbad the Sailor
  - The Sixth Voyage of Sindbad the Sailor
  - The Seventh and Last Voyage of Sindbad the Sailor
- The tale of Zumurrud the beautiful, and of Ali Shar, son of Glory
- The tale of the six different coloured girls
- The extraordinary tale of the city of Brass
- The tale of Ibn al-Mansur and the two girls
- The tale of Wardan the butcher and the wazir’s daughter
- The tale of Yamlika, queen of the Serpents
  - The tale of Bulukiya
    - The tale of the fair sad youth
- The flowering terrace of wit and garden off gallantry
  - Al-Rashid and the fart
  - The youth and his master
  - The wonderful bag
  - Al-Rashid judges of love
  - Which is the better, a youth or a ripe man?
  - The price of cucumbers
  - White hair
  - A difficulty resolved
  - Abu Nuwas and Zubaidah’s bath
  - Abu Nuwas improvises
  - The ass
  - Zubaidah caught in the act
  - Male or female?
  - The share
  - The schoolmaster
  - Inscription on a chemise
  - Inscription on a cup
  - The khalifah in the basket
  - The tripe-cleaner
  - The girl cool-of-the-eyes
  - Girls or boys?
- The strange khalifah
- The tale of Rose-in-the-bud and World’s delight
- The magic tale of the ebony horse
- The tale of the shifts of Delilah-the-wily and her daughter Zainab-the-cheat, with Ahmad-the-Moth, Hasan-the-pest, and Ali Quicksilver
- The tale of Judar the fisherman or the enchanted bag
- The tale of Abu Kir and Abu Sir
- Moral anecdotes from the perfumed garden
  - The Three Wishes
  - The Boy and the Rubber
  - There is White and White
- The tale of Land Abdallah and Sea Abdallah
- The tale of the yellow youth
- The tale of Pomegranate-flower and Badr Basim
- Ishak’s winter evening
- The fallah of Egypt and his white children
- The tale of Khalifah the fisherman
- The adventures of Hasan of Basrah
- The diwan of jovial and indecent folk
  - The Historic Fart
  - The Two Jesters
  - A Woman’s Trick
- The tale of the sleeper wakened
- The loves of Zain al-Mawasif
- The tale of the lazy youth
- The tale of young Nur and the warrior Girl
- The recitals of generosity and conduct
  - Salah al-Din and His Wazir
  - The Lovers’ Tomb
  - The Divorce of Hind
- The strange tale of the mirror of virgins
- The tale of Ala al-Din and the wonderful lamp
- The parable of true learning
- Farizad of the rose’s smile
- The tale of Kamar and the expert Halimah
- The tale of the leg of mutton
- The keys of destiny
- The diwan of easy jests and laughing wisdom
  - The Everlasting Slippers
  - Buhlul the Jester
  - The Invitation to Universal Peace
  - The Tale of the Tied Points
  - The Tale of the Two Hashish-Eaters
  - The Tale of the Father of Farts
  - The Tale of the Kadi-Mule
  - The Kadi and the Ass’s Foal
  - The Tale of the Astute Kadi
  - The Man Who Understood Women
  - The Hashish-Eater in Judgment
- The tale of Princess Nur al-nihar and the lovely jinniyah
- The tale of Pearl-Harvest
- The tale of the two lives of sultan Mahmud
- The tale of the unending treasure
- The adventures of the royal bastard
  - The Tale of the Ape Youth
  - The First Madman’s Tale
  - The Second Madman’s Tale
  - The Third Madman’s Tale
- Wisdom below the severed heads
- The perfidy of wives
  - The pastrycook’s tale
  - The Greengrocer’s Tale
  - The Butcher’s Tale
  - The First Clarinet’s Tale
- The tale of Ali Baba and the forty thieves
- The meetings of Al-Rashid on the bridge of Baghdad
  - The Master of the White Mare
  - The Youth behind whom Indian and Chinese Airs were played
  - The Generous Sheikh
  - The Split-Mouth Schoolmaster
  - The Blind Man who would be buffeted
- The tale of princess Zulaikah
- Sweet tales of careless youth
  - Hard-Head and his Sister Little-Foot
  - The Anklet
  - The He-Goat and the King’s Daughter
  - The Prince and the Tortoise
  - The Chick-Pea Seller’s Daughter
  - The Looser
  - The Captain of Police
  - A Contest in Generosity
  - The Gelded Barber
  - Firuz and His Wife
  - The Mind and the Soil
- The tale of the magic book
- The splendid tale of prince Diamond
- Some jests and suggestions of the master of shifts and laughter
- The tale of the girl Heart’s-Miracle, lieutenant of the birds
- The tale of al-Malik Baibars and his Captains of police
  - The First Captain’s Tale
  - The Second Captain’s Tale
  - The Third Captain’s Tale
  - The Fourth Captain’s Tale
  - The Fifth Captain’s Tale
  - The Sixth Captain’s Tale
  - The Seventh Captain’s Tale
  - The Eighth Captain’s Tale
  - The Ninth Captain’s Tale
  - The Tenth Captain’s Tale
  - The Eleventh Captain’s Tale
  - The Twelfth Captain’s Tale
- The tale of the sea rose of the girl of China
- The tale of the honey cake and the cobbler’s calamitous wife
- Windows on the garden of history
  - The Poet Duraid, His Generosity, and His Love for Tumadir al-Khansah
  - Ufairah the Suns, and Hudhailah the Moons, the Warrior Daughters of the Poet Find
  - The Love Story of Princess Fatimah and the Poet Murakkish
  - The Vengeance of King Hujr
  - Men in the Judgment of Their Wives
  - Tales of Umar ibn al-Khattab
  - Blue Salamah the Singer
  - The Tale of the Parasite
  - The Tale of the Slave of Destiny
  - The Tale of the Fatal Collar
  - Ishak of Mosul and the Lost Melody
  - The Two Dancers
  - The Pistachio Oil Cream, and the Legal Point
  - The Arab Girl at the Fountain
  - The Perils of Insistence
- The end of Jafar and the Barmakids
- The tender tale of Prince Jasmine and Princess Almond
- Conclusion
