= Veniamin Belkin =

Russian painter

Veniamin Pavlovich Belkin (Russian: Вениамин Павлович Белкин, January 26, 1884, Verkhoturye, Verkhotursky Uyezd, Perm Governorate — November 8, 1951, Leningrad, now Saint Petersburg) was a Russian painter and draughtsman during the Modernist period. He made a lot of book artwork and was presented at various exhibitions from 1906, both in the Soviet Union (Moscow, Leningrad) and abroad (Paris, New York, Boston).

Among Belkin's notable scores are those for The Decameron, The Three Musketeers, A Hero of Our Time and The Knight in the Panther's Skin. He also worked for famous publishing house Academia. Belkin was a close friend of Alexey Tolstoy and Anna Akhmatova.
