= Coat of arms of Algiers =

The coat of arms of Algiers, the capital of Algeria, was created after the country's independence; it shows a fortress, which symbolizes the Casbah, and a boat which symbolize the Algerian fleet, vital to the country's economy in older times, as well as two lions, which can be seen in Bab Azzoun, one of the gates of the city. The crescent symbolizes Islam, the state religion, the feather to symbolize scientific and cultural development. The sheaf of wheat (the main crop of the country) symbolizes agriculture, while the wheel symbolizes industry (Algiers is the largest industrial center of the country).

On top of the shield is a mural crown.

== Former arms ==
The city of Algiers, under the Ottoman Regency, developed and displayed several forms of heraldic symbolism, particularly coats of arms carved on its gates, buildings, and official emblems. These representations combined Islamic symbols, colours, and military motifs, and they were often linked to the authority of the Deys of Algiers, which stemmed directly from the legitimacy they received from the local marabouts.

One of the earliest recorded descriptions comes from Feuillets d'El-Djezaïr (1937), which recounts the decoration of the Bab-el-Dzezira (Gate of the Island) near the Admiralty. Its pediment bore an escutcheon, said to have been the work of a slave, which displayed the Seal of Solomon beneath a crown topped by a crescent. This crest was enriched with flags, lions, cannons, and ships, and was long regarded as the "ancient arms of Algiers". According to this source, the design was replaced by new heraldic symbols after 1862.

A later account published in the Flag Bulletin (1986) affirms that at least one Dey of Algiers possessed an official coat of arms. Surviving examples are sculpted into the stonework of buildings in Algiers, though today they are mostly covered with whitewash. Recorded descriptions state that the arms consisted of:

- A green shield, bearing the interlacing triangles known as the Seal of Solomon, rendered in gold;
- A silver crescent placed at the center of the design;
- A red border encircling the shield;
- And a crown surmounting the whole composition.

This imagery may have contributed to French reports which inaccurately described the Deys of Algiers as having a “green standard with a golden crescent.”

The historian Nadir Assari, in Alger: des origines à la régence turque (2007), provides another version of the coat of arms. He describes it as a heart-shaped shield, resting on a ball and topped by a crown surmounted with a crescent. Inside the shield appeared a star enclosing a crescent, a motif locally called the Khatem Sidna Slimane (“Seal of our Lord Solomon”). The escutcheon was accompanied by four tricolored flags (red, green, and yellow), arranged in pairs on either side and crossed in saltire. Supporting the shield were two climbing lions, whose hind legs rested upon cannons. This representation combined heraldry, martial imagery, and Ottoman-Islamic symbolism to affirm the authority of Algiers.

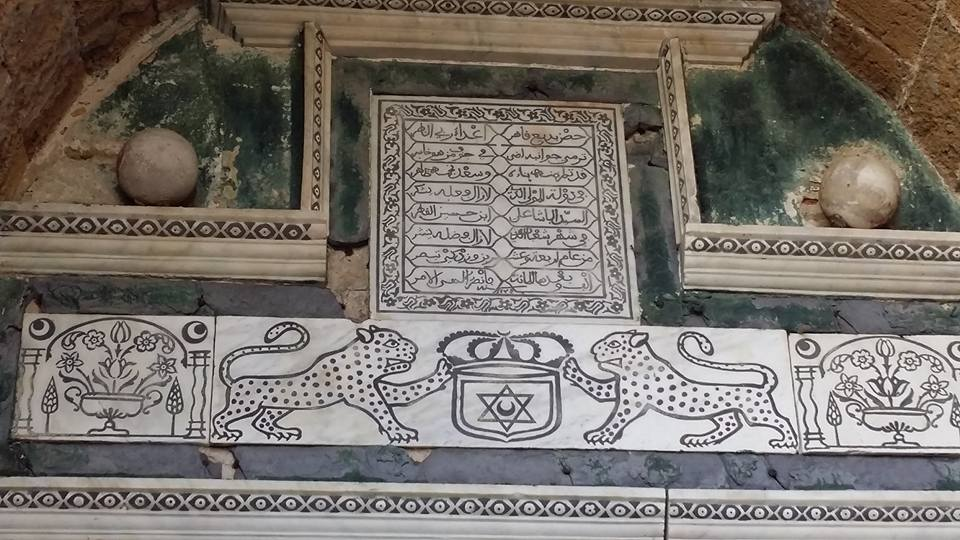
Coat of arms of Algiers in Bab sboua (Gate of the lions)

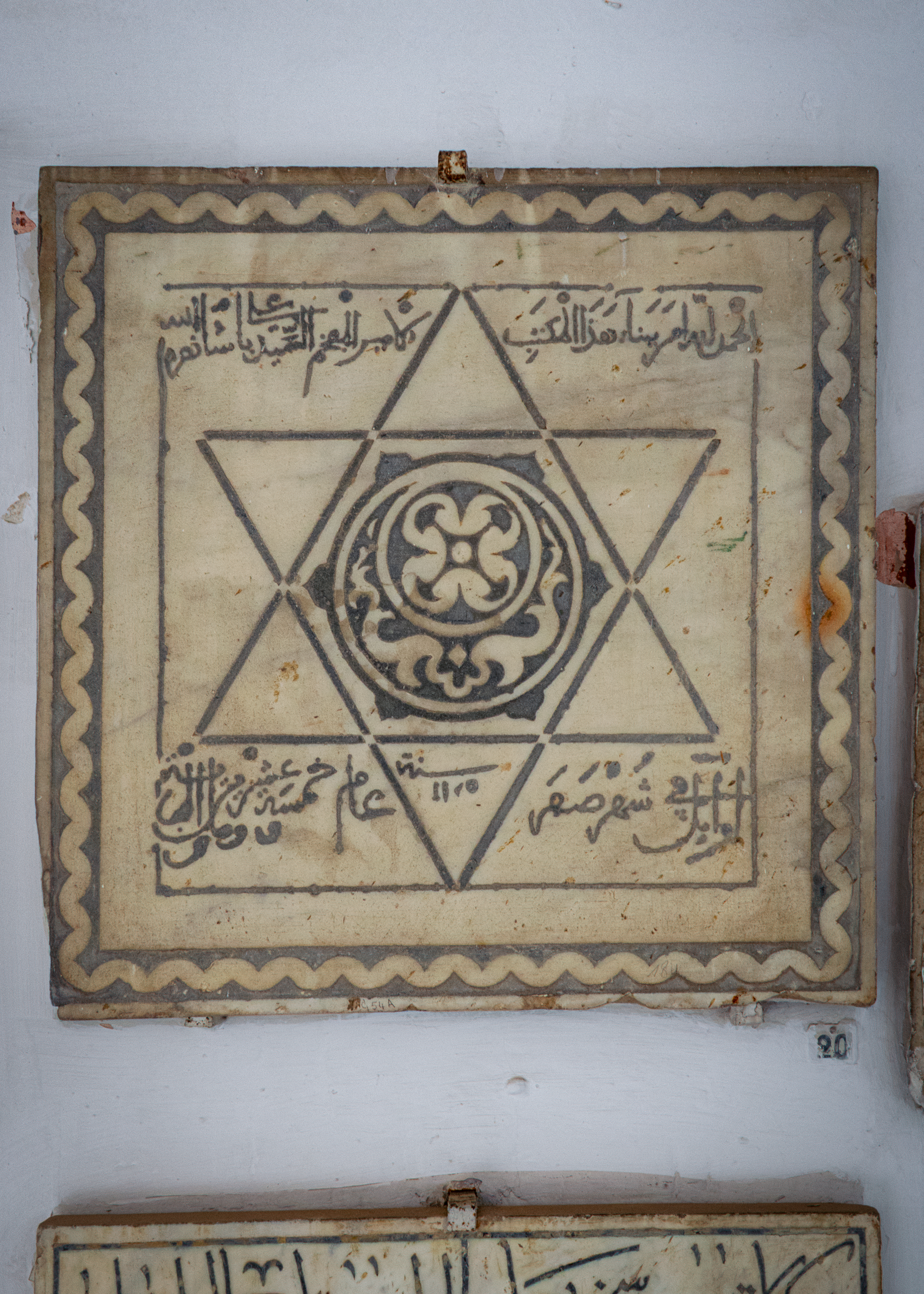
Inscription regarding a school built by Dey Baba Ali Chaouch, Regency of Algiers

=== Historical Context ===
The symbolism of Algiers drew heavily on the Seal of Solomon, a mystical figure composed of two interlaced triangles, widely used in Islamic and Ottoman iconography. Combined with crescents, crowns, flags, and lions, the arms of Algiers reflected a blend of Islamic spirituality, Ottoman statecraft, and martial power.

Early testimony, such as that of Musa Al-Andalusi (1630), also situates the heraldic and symbolic culture of Algiers within the broader traditions of the Maghreb and the Ottoman world. Over time, these arms came to represent not only the ruling Deys but also the civic identity of the city itself, until their gradual decline and replacement during the French colonial period after 1830.

== French Algeria ==

During the time as a French colony, the arms of Algiers had a bend sinister or in the arms, on which was a lion proper. The lion was also resting its paw on a boulet, likewise having the tincture proper. This and the inescutcheon with the cross was removed when creating the present arms.

== Sources ==
- Heraldry of the World: Alger/Algiers
