= François-Louis Schmied =

French visual artist (1873–1941)

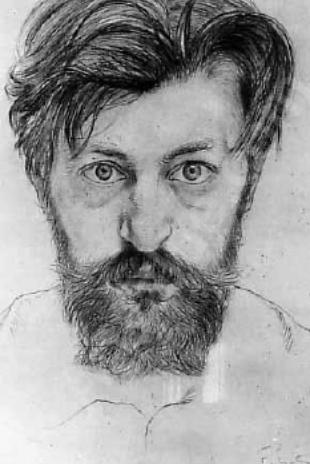
Self-portrait, c. 1904

François-Louis Schmied (8 November 1873 in Geneva – January 1941 in Tahanaout, Morocco), was a French painter, wood engraver, printer, editor, illustrator, and bookbinder.

Of Swiss origin, François-Louis Schmied established himself in France, where he was later naturalized, and ultimately was exiled in Morocco around 1931 or 1932. He is considered a major artist in the Art Deco style, particularly in the area of publishing for bibliophiles. He is the father of engraver Théo Schmied, who directed François-Louis Schmied's workshop beginning in 1924.

In 1910, Schmied was commissioned to engrave and print Paul Jouve's illustrations for The Jungle Book by Rudyard Kipling.

== See also ==
- School of Paris
- Années folles
- Art Deco
