= Vasili Azarov =

Russian footballer

Personal information
- Full name: Vasili Yevgenyevich Azarov
- Date of birth: 19 August 1992 (age 34)
- Height: 1.87 m (6 ft 2 in)
- Position: Goalkeeper

Senior career*
Years	Team	Apps	(Gls)
2011–2012	FC Yenisey-2 Krasnoyarsk		
2014–2016	FC Yenisey Krasnoyarsk	7	(0)
2016	FC Oryol	9	(0)
2017–2018	FC Ryazan	1	(0)
- * Club domestic league appearances and goals

Vasili Yevgenyevich Azarov (Russian: Василий Евгеньевич Азаров; born 19 August 1992) is a Russian former football player.

== Club career ==
He made his debut in the Russian Football National League for FC Yenisey Krasnoyarsk on 12 March 2016 in a game against FC Baikal Irkutsk.
