= Leonid Khizhinsky =

Soviet illustrator (1896–1972)

Leonid Semyonovich Khizhinsky (Ukrainian: Хижинський Леонід Семенович; 1896 in Kiev – 1972) was a graphic artist and illustrator of Ukrainian origin. In 1924 the Leningrad publishing houses, most notably Academia, drew Khizhinsky and he ultimately chose the wood engraving. Khizhinsky's artwork was inspired by the paintings of Mikhail Vrubel and the culture of Kievan Rus.

Khizhinsky's artwork adorns the comedies of Carlo Goldoni, Heine's Reisebilder and Mérimée's A Chronicle of the Reign of Charles IX, as well as the Russian folk tales by Olga Ozarovskaya and riddles by M. A. Rybnikova.
