= Omar Racim =

Algerian painter (1884–1959)

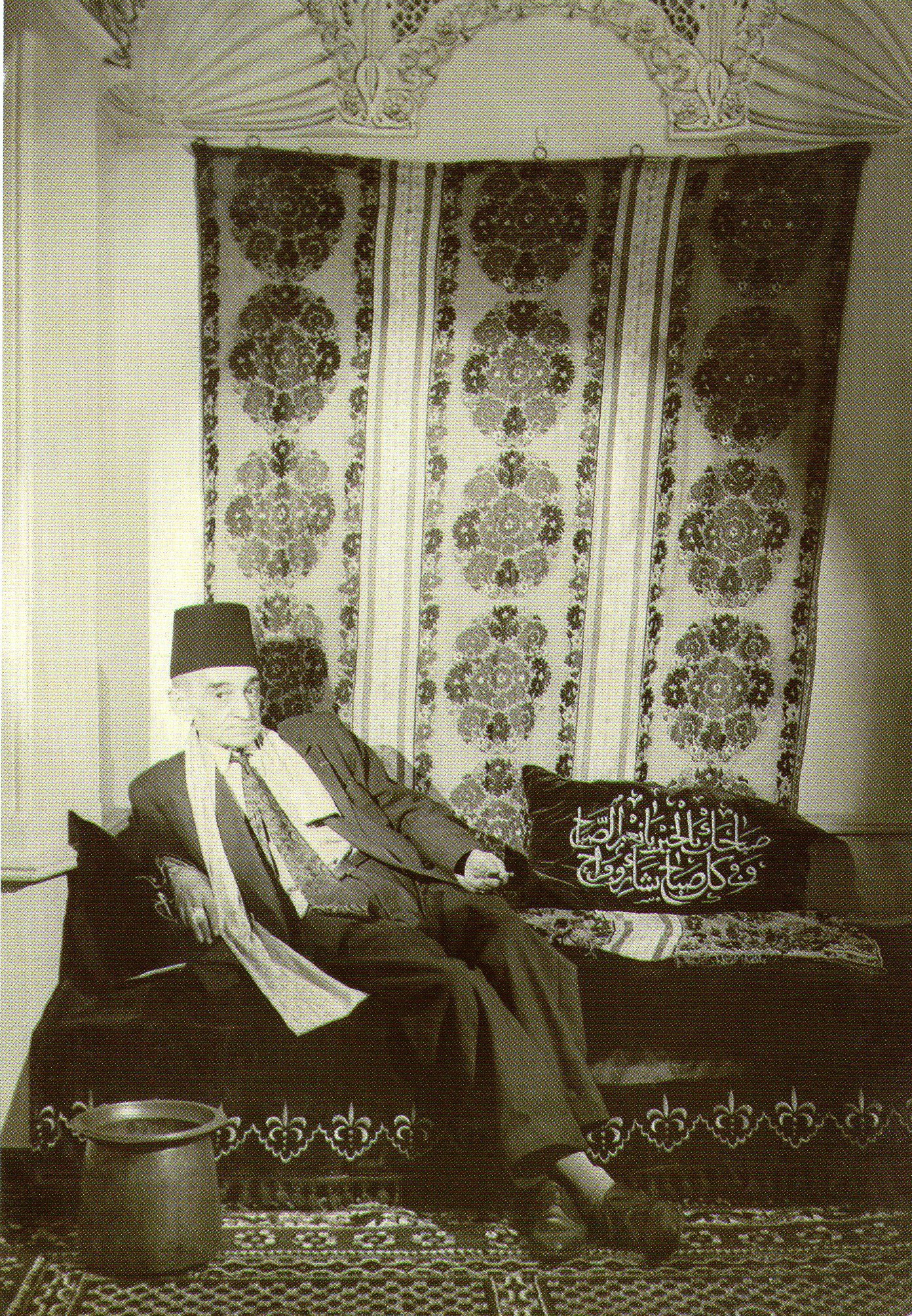
- Born: 1884; Algeria
- Died: 1959
- Known for: Painting, Writing

Omar Racim (1884–1959) was an Algerian artist who founded the Algerian school of miniature painting in 1939, alongside his brother Mohammed Racim. Racim also founded the nationalist journals Al Djazair in 1908, Al Farouq in 1913, and Dhou El Fikar in 1913.

== Biography ==
Racim was born in 1884 into a distinguished family of artists of Turkish descent whose pre-colonial prosperity had been undermined by the French regime's confiscation of property. A year after his studies in Madrasa Thaalibia, Racim worked in the family workshop, one which his father had re-established as a wood-carving and copper-working workshop in the Casbah of Algiers and where he engraved decorated tombstones. The Racim family won commissions for decorating public buildings and the pavilions of French colonial exhibitions.

A renowned calligrapher, Racim also devoted himself to a life of religion and politics. In 1907, he wrote the Mus'haf of the Thaalibia Quran. In 1912, he made a trip to Egypt and Syria, bringing back with him various Qurans and specimens of Arabic illumination. By 1913, he was publishing papers on politics, and during World War I was arrested by the French security for his political activities; initially banished, and then condemned to prison.

Released from prison on 21 September 1921, he began to focus his activities in the field of applied arts and traveled to Tunisia, Morocco, Egypt, and France. Alongside his brother, Mohammed Racim, they were included in the Algerian hall of the Pavillon de l'Afrique du nord as exponents of the art of miniature. Victor Barrucand mentioned that: "The beautiful ornamented inscriptions of Omar Racim leave those of the other sections far behind. In them the artist is able to enclose the mystery of thought in the elegance of the arabesque".

After his death in 1959, he was buried in the Thaalibia Cemetery of the Casbah of Algiers.

== Bibliography ==
- Abrous, Mansour (2006), "Racim, Omar", Dictionnaire des artistes algériens: 1917–2006, Editions L'Harmattan, ISBN 2296159133.
- Benjamin, Roger (2002), "Colonial Tutelage to Nationalist Affirmation: Mammeri and Racim, Painters of the Maghreb", in Beaulieu, Jill; Roberts, Mary (eds.), Orientalism's Interlocutors: Painting, Architecture, Photography, Duke University Press, ISBN 0822328747.
- Benjamin, Roger (2004), "Orientalism, modernism and indigenous identity", in Edwards, Steve; Wood, Paul (eds.), Art of the Avant-Gardes, Yale University Press, ISBN 0300102305.
