= Mikhail Salye =

Mikhail Alexandrovich Salye (21 August 1899 – 17 August 1961) was a Soviet Arabist scholar and translator. Salye was the first to translate One Thousand and One Nights into Russian directly from the Arabic source. Additionally, he translated into Russian seven tales not contained in the Calcutta II edition of One Thousand and One Nights (from the manuscript in the National Library of Russia).

In 1919–1923 Salye studied in the Saint Petersburg Institute of Oriental Languages. In 1926, having graduated from the Saint Petersburg State University, Salye entered the Institute of the Comparative Analysis of the Literatures and Languages of the West and East of that university. In 1921–22 Salye made trips to Tashkent, where he lectured at a local institute. In 1934 Salye was admitted to the Union of Writers of the USSR. He translated Tawfiq al-Hakim and other authors.

Salye is buried at the Botkinskoye Cemetery in Tashkent.

== Works (in Russian) ==
- «Материалы для датировки сказки об Ал-ад-дине Абу-ш-Шаалате (из “Тысячи и одной ночи”)
- «Неизвестный вариант сказки о рыбаке и духе из 1001 ночи»
- «Алишер Навои как биограф»
- «Мухаммед аль Хорезми – великий узбекский ученый»
