= J. C. Mardrus =

French physician, poet and translator (1868–1949)

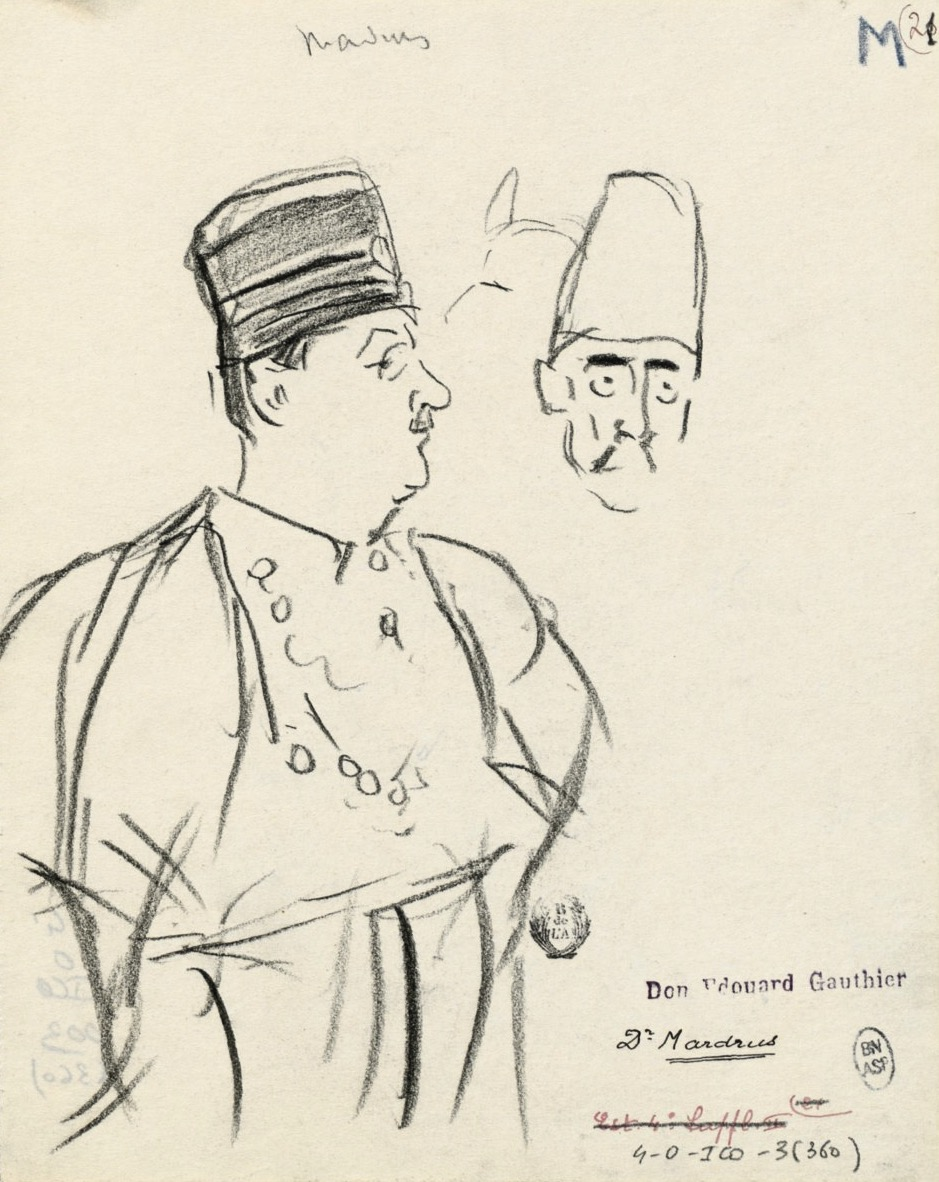
A drawing of Joseph Charles Mardrus

Joseph Charles Mardrus, otherwise known as "Jean-Charles Mardrus" (1868–1949), was a French physician, poet, and noted translator. Today he is best known for his translation of the Thousand and One Nights from Arabic into French, which was published from 1898 to 1904, , named Le livre des mille nuits et une nuit and was in turn rendered into English by Edward Powys Mathers. A newer edition of his translation , was published in 1926–1932.

== Biography ==
Mardrus was born in Cairo, Egypt in 1868 to a Catholic family of Armenian-descent, and studied in Lebanon before settling in Paris, France.

As a doctor for the French government, he worked throughout Morocco and the Far East. He produced other translations, some illustrated by the Swiss engraver François-Louis Schmied (1873–1941). He married the novelist and poet Lucie Delarue-Mardrus on 5 June 1900. In 1914 he met Gabrielle Bralant ("Cobrette"), whom he would later marry, and he and Lucie separated in the following year.

Elvira Buder (born 1918) claimed to have travelled from Egypt via Greece with Mardrus in the 1930s with the intention of attending the Sorbonne. Soon after arriving in Paris war broke out and she found herself pregnant and in France on an Italian passport. Buder left France for Italy when the Germans occupied Paris, although she claimed that Mardrus was not the father of her child. Much later they met for the last time when Buder had just married E.W.N. Mallows, son of C.E. Mallows Charles Edward Mallows. Mardrus was a friend of Louis Aragon and introduced Buder to him.

== Works ==
- Les Mille et Une Nuits (The 1001 Nights, edited by Robert Laffont; in the Bouquins collection)
- L’Apocalypse qui est la révélation
- Le Livre des Morts de l’Ancienne Égypte
- Le Cantique des Cantiques
- Le Livre des Rois
- Sucre d’amour (1926), illustrated by François-Louis Schmied
- La Reine de Saba (1918)
- La Reine de Saba et divers autres contes (1921)
- Le Marié Magique (1930), Société des Bibliophiles Franco-Suisses Illustrations de Antoine Bourdelle Jean Saude
- Le Koran, commissioned by the French government in 1925
- Le Paradis musulman (1930), illustrated by François-Louis Schmied
- Toute-Puissance de l'Adepte (Le Livre de la Vérité de Parole) 1932
