= Mohammed Racim =

Algerian painter (1896 – 1975)

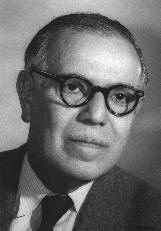
- Mohammed Racim
- Born: 24 June 1896; Algiers, French Algeria
- Died: 30 March 1975 (aged 78); Algiers, Algeria
- Known for: Painting, drawing

Mohammed Racim (Arabic: محمد راسم, 24 June 1896 – 30 March 1975) was an Algerian artist who founded the Algerian School for Miniature Painting with his brother, Omar. It still exists to this day.

== Biography ==
Racim was born in The Casbah of Algiers in 1896 into a distinguished family of artists, whose pre-colonial prosperity had been undermined by the French regime's confiscation of property. In 1880, Racim's father had re-established a wood-carving and copper-working workshop in the Casbah of Algiers, where his brother, Omar Racim, engraved decorated tombstones. The Racim family won commissions for decorating public buildings and the pavilions of French colonial exhibitions.

His talent for drawing was recognised during his primary education when he was given work copying Islamic decorative motifs for the state workshops set up by the Governor Charles Jonnart. By about 1914, Racim discovered the works of the Persian, Mughal and Andalusian miniatures made for the private use of the Muslim nobility. He evolved a personal hybrid form of expression through the miniature whereby he would use traditional materials and classical arabesque and calligraphic styles, yet use them to frame figurative inserts that had some modern features.

As a teenager Racim befriended Nasreddine Dinet, who advised him on painting the figure and helped him obtain commissions to decorate books with calligraphic plates. Racim's main patrons were businessmen and government officials who valued his re-creation of the milieu of old Algeria.

By the late 1930s, he became a major figure in Algerian culture. As with most of his work, Racim's "Women at the Cascade" set out an imagined past, before the arrival of the French colonizers, when the indigenous were masters of the Maghreb. The people of Algeria, prior to the French arrival, appear in his works as prosperous, given to fine textiles and costumes, and the arts of music, architecture and gardening. In fact, Roger Benjamin has argued that Racim's work could be said to wish away the presence of the foreign French settlers in his country. He celebrates a pristine Turkish city, not the industrialized port that had resulted for a century of French modernization. Nonetheless, he was not an ideologue, and recognized that his work had been enabled by the French scholarly.

Mohammed Racim and his wife were murdered in their home on 30 March 1975. He was buried with his wife in the Thaalibia Cemetery of the Casbah of Algiers.

== Tribute ==
On 24 June 2021, Google celebrated what would have been his 125th birthday with a Google Doodle.

== Bibliography ==
- Benjamin, Roger (2002), "Colonial Tutelage to Nationalist Affirmation: Mammeri and Racim, Painters of the Maghreb", in Beaulieu, Jill; Roberts, Mary (eds.), Orientalism's Interlocutors: Painting, Architecture, Photography, Duke University Press, ISBN 0822328747.
- Benjamin, Roger (2004), "Orientalism, modernism and indigenous identity", in Edwards, Steve; Wood, Paul (eds.), Art of the Avant-Gardes, Yale University Press, ISBN 0300102305.
- Thornton, Lynne (1985), "Racim, Mohammed", La femme dans la peinture Orientaliste, Art Creation Realisation, ISBN 2867700116.
