= List of Algerians =

Notable Algerians include:

== Artists ==
=== Actors ===
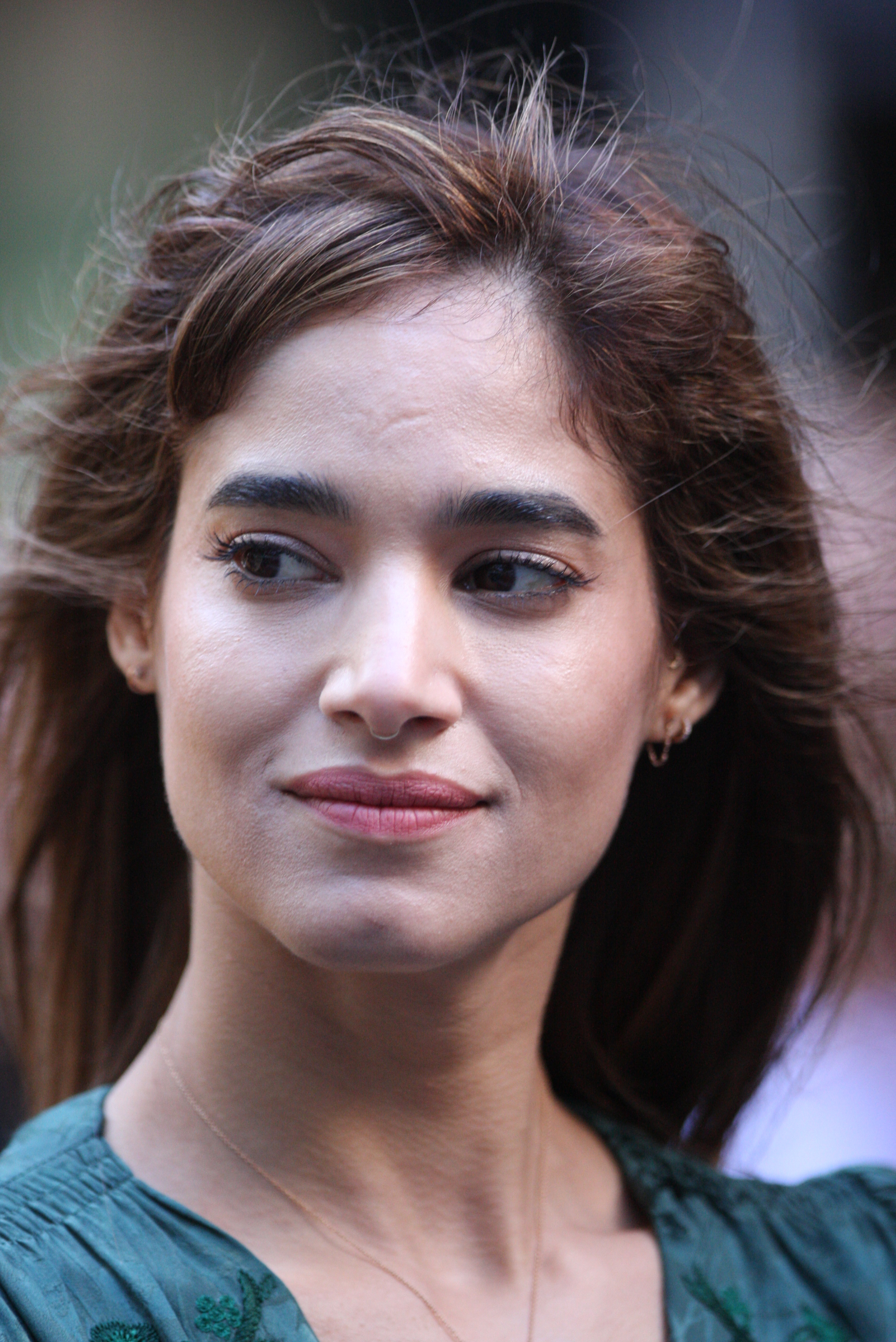
Sofia Boutella

- Hadj Abderrahmane, actor and comedian
- Isabelle Adjani, French actress
- Allalou, playwright, theatre director, and actor known as the father of Algerian theater
- Mahieddine Bachtarzi, singer of opera (tenor), actor, writer, and director of the TNA (Théâtre National Algérien)
- Jean-Pierre Bacri, actor and screenwriter
- Ramzy Bedia, French-Algerian actor
- Leïla Bekhti, French-Algerian actress
- Alice Belaïdi, French-Algerian actress
- Catherine Belkhodja, French-Algerian actress
- M'hamed Benguettaf, actor and playwright
- Jean Benguigui, stage, screen, and television actor
- Dali Benssalah, actor in James Bond movie No Time to Die (2021)
- Biyouna, singer, actress and comedian
- Mohamed Bouchaïb, Libya-born Algerian actor
- Sofia Boutella, actress, model and dancer
- Rachida Brakni, French actress
- Patrick Bruel, singer, actor, and professional poker player
- Alain Chabat, actor and director
- Mohamed Chouikh, filmmaker
- Mohamed Fellag, actor and comedian
- Eva Green, actress and model
- Khaled Habib, singer-songwriter, composer, actor, film director
- Roger Hanin, film actor and director
- Marlène Jobert, actress, singer and author
- Reda Kateb, actor
- Sid Ali Kouiret, actor
- Rachid Ksentini, actor and comedian
- Karim Leklou, actor
- Maïwenn, actress, film director and producer
- Tahar Rahim, actor
- Rouiched, comedy actor
- Lyes Salem, actor and film director
- Hadj Smaine Mohamed Seghir, actor, director, and man of stage
- Samy Seghir, French-Algerian actor
- Smaïn, actor and humorist
- Marie Soussan, actress and singer
- Patrick Timsit, comedian, writer, and film director
- Larbi Zekkal, actor and comedian

=== Directors and filmmakers ===
- Merzak Allouache, film director
- Abdelkader Alloula, theatre producer
- Jean-Luc Azoulay, television producer
- Yamina Benguigui, filmmaker
- Malek Bensmaïl, film director
- Mohammed Lakhdar-Hamina, film director, Palme d'Or at the 1975 Cannes Festival
- Ahmed Rachedi, film director–producer, pioneer of Algerian cinema
- Fatma Zohra Zamoum, film director

=== Fashion (designers, models) ===
- Loli Bahia, model
- Farida Khelfa, former model and actress
- Yves Saint Laurent, designer

=== Illustrators ===
- Baya, painter
- Ali Dilem, editorial cartoonist
- Le Hic, editorial cartoonist
- Lucien Lévy-Dhurmer, artist
- Rezki Zerarti, painter
- Hocine Ziani, painter

=== New media ===
- Maurice Benayoun, artist and theorist

=== Writers (including poets) ===
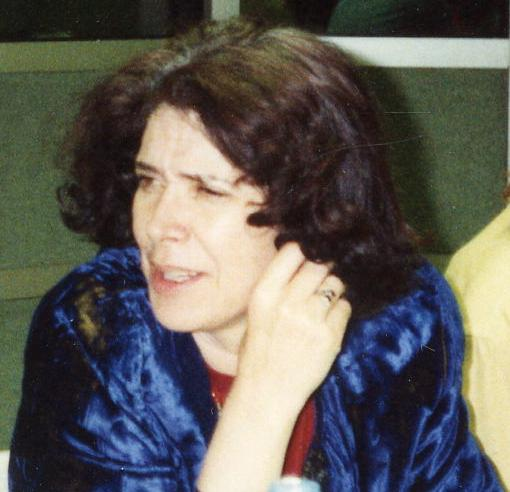
Assia Djebar

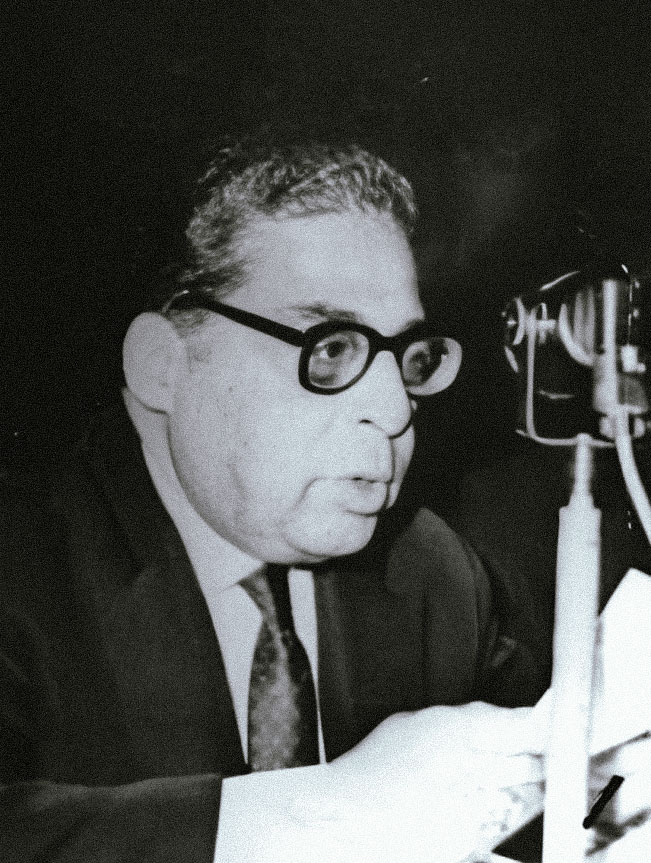
Moufdi Zakaria

- Ferhat Abbas (1899–1985), political leader and essayist
- Mohamed Aïchaoui (1921–1959), political leader and journalist
- Al-Akhdari (1512–1575), Arab-Algerian poet, Alim, astronomer, jurist and logician of Sherifian descent
- Abdelkader Alloula (1939–1994), playwright
- Malek Alloula (1937–2015), poet, writer, and critic
- Djamal Amrani (1935–2005), poet and essayist
- Jean Amrouche (1906–1962), 20th-century poet and writer
- Taos Amrouche (1913–1976), singer and writer
- Apuleius (c. 125–c. 180 C.E.), Latin prose writer
- Mohammed Arkoun (born 1928), scholar and thinker
- Zighen Aym (born 1957), writer and engineer
- Farida Belghoul (born 1958), author
- Omar Belhouchet (born 1954), journalist
- Myriam Ben (1928–2001), novelist, poet, painter, and activist
- Berthe Bénichou-Aboulker (1888–1942), poet
- Mohammed Benchicou (born 1952), director and publisher of the Algerian newspaper Le Matin
- Salah Benlabed (born 1950), architect, academic, novelist and poet
- Malek Bennabi (1905–1973), writer and philosopher
- Rachid Boudjedra (born 1941), poet, novelist, playwright and critic
- Albert Camus (1913–1960), journalist, author, philosopher
- Mohamed Cherak, journalist
- Hélène Cixous, feminist writer
- Mohammed Dib (1920–2003), 20th-century writer
- Leila Djabali (born 1933)
- Tahar Djaout (1954–1993), poet, journalist, critic
- Assia Djebar (1936–2015), novelist, translator and filmmaker
- Mouloud Feraoun (1913–1962), writer and independence war hero
- Mohamed Hassaïne (1945–1994), journalist
- Miloud Hmida (born 1961), poet, critic, translator
- Yasmina Khadra (also known as Mohamed Moulessehoul) (born 1955), writer
- Aïssa Khelladi, journalist, novelist and playwright
- Ahmed Mahsas (1923–2013), political leader and writer
- Latifa Ben Mansour (born 1950), writer, psychoanalyst, and linguist
- Fodil Mezali (born 1959), journalist and writer
- Hocine Mezali (born 1938), journalist and writer
- Rachid Mimouni (1945–1995), writer, poet
- Ahlam Mostaghanemi, writer
- Sarah Rivens, writer
- Othmane Senadjki (1959–2010), journalist
- Ahmed Ben Triki (1650–1750), Algerian poet from Tlemcen
- Kateb Yacine (1929–1989), 20th-century writer
- Moufdi Zakaria (1908–1977), lyricist of the Algerian national anthem "Kassaman"

== Criminals ==
- Djamel Beghal, French Algerian convicted of terrorism
- Mokhtar Belmokhtar, sentenced to death for murder and terrorism
- Abdul Nacer Benbrika, found guilty of being the leader of a terrorist organisation
- Hamza Bendelladj, cyber-criminal also known as the "Smiling Hacker"
- Rédoine Faïd, French-Algerian bank robber and jailbreaker
- Slimane Khalfaoui, French-Algerian terrorist convicted of the Strasbourg cathedral bombing plot
- Ahmed Ressam, Algerian al-Qaeda member convicted of attempting to bomb the Los Angeles International Airport on New Year's Eve 1999
- Abu Musab Abdel Wadoud, leader of the Algerian Islamic militant group Al-Qaeda organization in the Islamic Maghreb

== Journalists ==
- Abdessami' Abdelhaï, journalist

== Leaders and politicians ==
=== Ancient Algeria ===
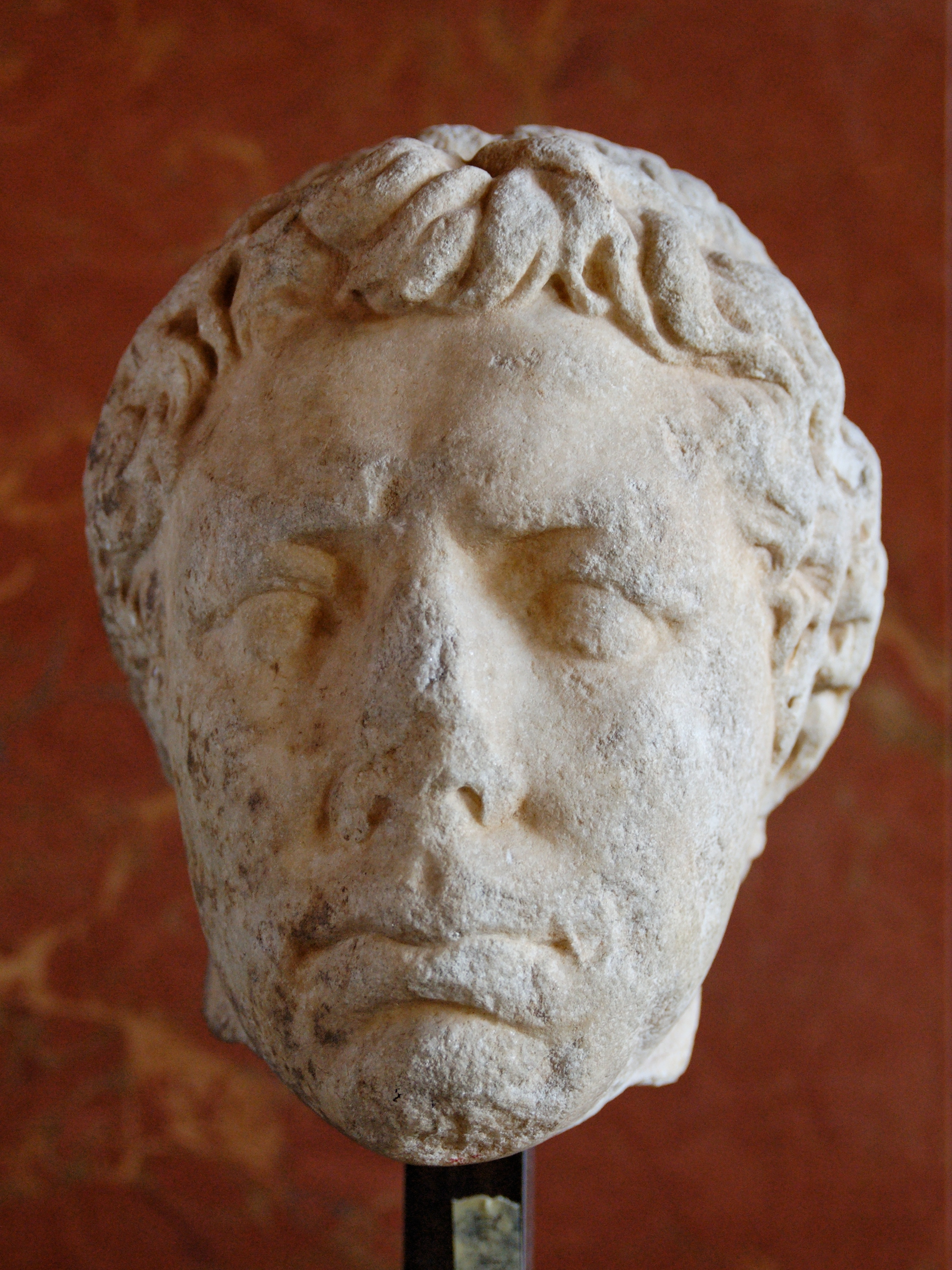
Juba II

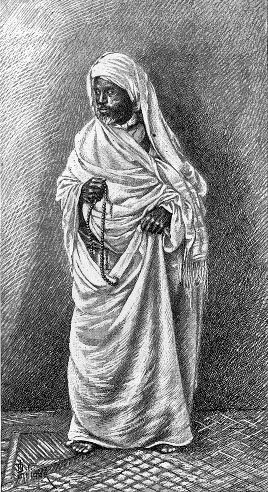

- Juba I, 1st century BC, king of Numidia under Roman rule
- Saburra, Numidian general
- Juba II, 1st century BC, king of Numidia under Roman rule
- Naravas, Numidian chief
- Jugurtha, 2nd century BC, king of Numidia
- Zelalsen, king of the Massylii
- Ozalces, king of the Massylii
- Capussa, king of the Massylii tribe and brother to King Gaia
- Gala, king of the Massylii tribe
- Lacumazes, king of the Massylii tribe
- Syphax, king of the Massylii tribe
- Vermina, son of Sypbax and king of the Masaesyli tribe
- Archobarzane, last king of the Masaesylians
- Massinissa, 3rd century BC, king of Numidia
- Micipsa, king of Numidia
- Gulussa, king of Numidia along with his two brothers
- Mastanabal, king of Numidia
- Adherbal, king of Numidia
- Hiempsal I, king of Numidia
- Gauda, Jugurtha's brother; a king of Numidia
- Iarbas, Gaetulian king
- Hiarbas, king, usurped the throne of Numidia
- Hiempsal II, son of Gauda and king of Numidia
- Masteabar, king of western Numidia
- Massinissa II, king of western Numidia
- Arabio, last independent king of Numidia
- Cleopatra Selene II, wife of juba II
- Ptolemy of Mauretania, last king of Mauretania
- Tacfarinas, leader of a rebellion against the Romans
- Firmus, Numidian prince and Roman usurper
- Gildo, Roman Berber general
- Macrinus, Roman emperor
- Pope Gelasius I, pope from 1 March 492 to his death in 496
- Quintus Lollius Urbicus, governor of Roman Britain
- Masuna, first recorded king of the Mauro-Roman Kingdom
- Mastigas, Masuna's successor
- John, Berber military leader
- Garmul, last recorded king of the Mauro Roman kingdom
- Masties, founder and first king of the Kingdom of the Aurès
- Iaudas, Berber leader and king of the Aurès
- Kusaila, last king of Altava who led a resistance against Islam
- Dihya, uncontested ruler of the whole Maghreb
- Tabat, Dihya's father

=== Early Islamic Algeria ===
- Abu Qurra, proclaimed caliph by the banu ifran Berber tribe; founder of the indigenous Berber Muslim movement of Kharijite tendencies in North Africa; founder of the Emirate of Tlemcen
- Sulayman ibn Abd-Allah, known as "Sulayman I of Tlemcen"; emir of Tlemcen (786 / 7–813)
- Abd al-Rahman ibn Rustam, of Persian descent, founder of the Rustamid dynasty centered around Tiaret in modern-day Algeria
- Buluggin ibn Ziri, 10th-century emir; founder of the city of Algiers (Dzayer in Algerian Arabic refers to his father Ziri ibn Manad, founder of the Zirid dynasty)
- Hammad ibn Buluggin, founder and first Sultan of the Hammadid dynasty centered around Al Qal'a of Beni Hammad from 1008 to 1090, then Béjaïa from 1090 to 1152
- Abd al-Mu'min, first caliph and founder of the Almohad dynasty
- Yaghmurasen Ibn Zyan, founder and first sultan of the Zayyanid dynasty centered around Tlemcen in modern-day Algeria

=== Ottoman Algeria ===
- Hassan Agha, 16th-century Prince of Algiers; defeated Emperor Charles V in Algiers
- Baba Aruj, 16th-century corsair; leader of the Regency of Algiers
- Hayreddin Barbarossa, brother and successor of Aruj
- Zymen Danseker, Dutch privateer during the Eighty Years' War, became admiral of the Algerian fleet from 1600 to 1610; said to have introduced the round ship to the Algerians
- Rais Hamidou, nicknamed 'Amir el Bihar' (leader of the seas), admiral and last great leader of the Algerian Navy, of Berber descent
- Sulayman Reis, Dutch privateer during the Eighty Years' War; later turned to the corsair activity swearing allegiance to the Sultan of Algiers and became an officer under Zymen Danseker

=== Algeria under French colonization ===
- Emir Abdelkader, 19th-century leader of the resistance against French colonisation
- Hadj Ahmed Bey, last Bey of Constantine; fought the French Army during two sieges in 1836 and 1837
- Cheikh Boumerdassi, 19th-century leader of the resistance against French colonisation
- Mohamed Seghir Boushaki, 20th-century leader of the Kabyle political resistance against the French
- Mohamed Deriche, 20th-century leader of the Kabyle political resistance against the French
- Messali Hadj, co-founder of "l'Etoile Nord-Africaine", the first Algerian nationalist party
- Belkacem Radjef, co-founder of ENA with Messali Hadj and Amar Imache
- Lalla Fatma N'Soumer, 19th-century female leader of the Kabyle resistance against the French
- Mohamed ben Zamoum, 19th-century leader of the resistance against French colonisation
- Omar ben Zamoum, 19th-century leader of the resistance against French colonisation

=== Revolutionary War of Independence ===
- Ferhat Abbas, president of the provisional government of Algeria before independence, 1958–1961
- Mohamed Aïchaoui, journalist and independence war hero
- Colonel Amirouche, independence war hero
- Krim Belkacem, independence war hero; vice president of the provisional government of Algeria
- Jeanine Belkhodja, doctor, communist and activist
- Hassiba Benbouali, female hero of the independence war
- Mostefa Benboulaid, Commander of Zone 1 during the independence war
- Djamila Bouhired, female hero of the revolution
- Yahia Boushaki, political and military leader of the independence war
- Lyès Deriche, political leader of the independence war; member of the Revolutionary Committee of Unity and Action
- Ali La Pointe, also known as Ali Ammar; independence war hero
- Ahmed Mahsas, sociologist and independence war hero
- Larbi Ben M'hidi, commander of Zone 5 during the independence war
- Mohamed Rahmoune, political and military leader of the independence war
- Abane Ramdane, political leader of the independence war; author of the "political over military" and "interior over exterior" principles
- Yacef Saadi, fighter in the independence war in the 1957 Battle of Algiers; actor in the 1966 war film by the same name after independence
- Zazi Sadou, spokeswoman for the Algerian women's resistance movement

=== Independent Algeria ===
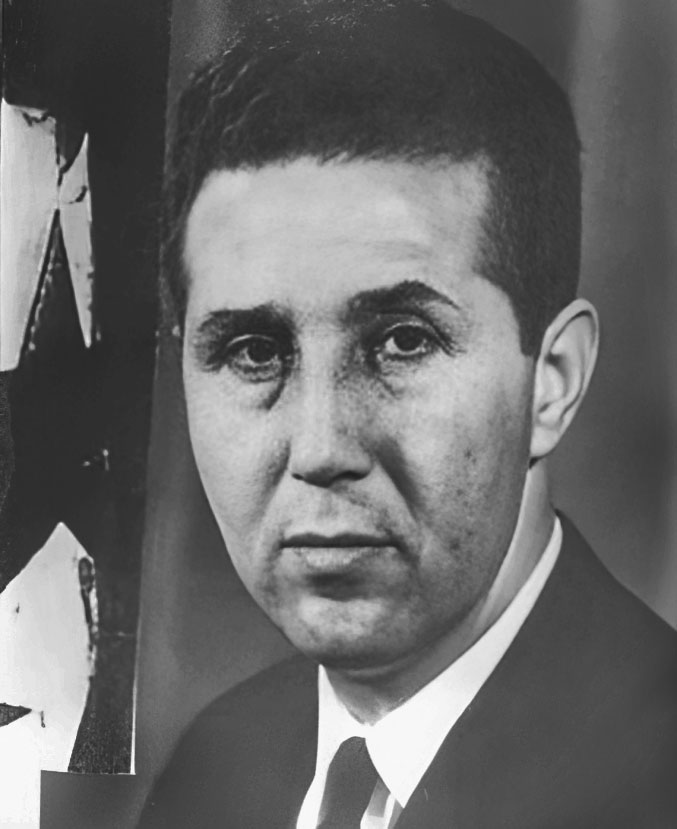
Ahmed Ben Bella

- Chaâbane Aït Abderrahim, Wali of M'Sila, Constantine, and Algiers provinces
- Hocine Ait Ahmed, political leader and head of the Socialist Forces Front opposition party (also a prominent independence war leader)
- Mohamed Bahi (born 1983/1984), American-Algerian former Chief Liaison of New York City Mayor Eric Adams to the Muslim community
- Ahmed Ben Bella, Algeria's first president, 1962–1965
- Mourad Benachenou, minister for the restructure of industry, 1995
- Zahia Benarous, journalist and politician, Secretary of State for Culture
- Chadli Bendjedid, president of Algeria, 1979–1992
- Maamar Benguerba, minister for labour and social affairs in the 1992 government
- Rabah Bitat, vice president of Algeria's first government, president of parliament
- Mohamed Boudiaf, president of Algeria, 1992 (also a prominent Independence war leader)
- Dalila Boudjemaa, agricultural engineer and politician
- Houari Boumedienne, president of Algeria, 1965–1978
- Abdelaziz Bouteflika, president of Algeria, 1999–2019
- Saïd Bouteflika, brother of Abdelaziz Bouteflika
- Lakhdar Brahimi, former Foreign Affairs Minister, Peace Envoy in Lebanon, Afghanistan and Iraq
- Émilie Busquant, French feminist, anarcho-syndicalist and anti-colonial activist; best known for the role in the creation of the Algerian flag
- Abdallah Djaballah, founder and leader of Al-Islah party
- Farida Haddouche, politician, party secretary general
- Louisa Hanoune, founder and female leader of the PT (Workers Party)
- Abelkader Khamri, former minister for youth and sport, 1992
- Chakib Khelil, former Minister of Energy and Mines, former OPEC president
- Abassi Madani, founder and leader of the Islamic Salvation Front (FIS) party
- Ahmed Mahsas, sociologist and founder and leader of the Union of Democratic Forces (UFD) party (also a prominent Independence war leader)
- Redha Malek, founder and leader of the ANR party
- Rabea Mechernane, minister of national solidarity and family in the 1990s
- Mahfoud Nahnah, founder and former leader of the HMS party
- Ahmed Ouyahia, former prime minister
- Nouara Saadia, Minister for Family and Women
- Said Sadi, founder and leader of the RCD party
- Farouk Tebbal, minister for the environment in the 1992 government
- Liamine Zeroual, president of Algeria, 1994–1999

== Martyrs ==
- Mohamed Aïchaoui
- Colonel Amirouche
- Hassiba Ben Bouali
- Larbi Ben M'hidi
- Cheikh Bouamama
- Houari Boumédiène
- Mourad Didouche
- Malika Gaïd
- Zighoud Youcef
- Ahmed Zabana
- Moufdi Zakaria
- Ali Ammar

== Military and intelligence services ==
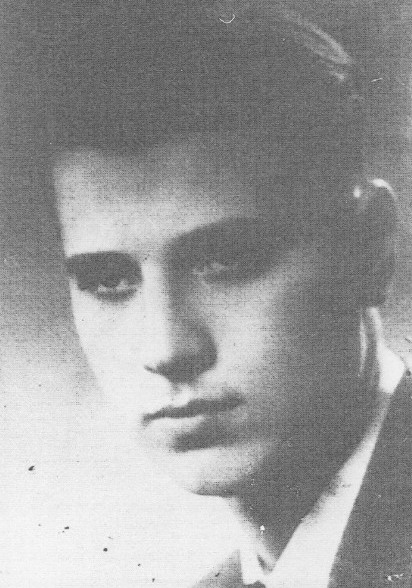
José Aboulker

- José Aboulker, member of the anti-Nazi resistance; later a neurosurgeon and political figure in France
- Larbi Belkheir (Aboulker), former general, Ambassador to Morocco
- Raïs Hamidou, Algerian corsair
- Mohamed Lamari, former Chief of Staff of the People's National Army
- Smain Lamari, head of the Department of Counter-Espionage and Internal Security
- Mohamed Mediène ("Toufik"), head of the Department of Information and Security
- Khaled Nezzar, retired general

== Musicians and singers ==
=== Berber ===
- Boualem Boukacem, singer, poet, musician
- Aïssa Djermouni, singer, poet
- Idir, singer, musician, composer
- Lounes Matoub, rebel singer of Kabyle music
- Lounis Ait Menguellet, singer, poet, musician
- Erika Sawajiri, singer, Algerian mother and Japanese father
- Takfarinas, singer

=== Classical ===
- Farid Ali, singer
- El Hadj M'Hamed El Anka, the Grand Master of Andalusian classical music and Chaabi (Algeria) music
- Boudjemaâ El Ankis, singer, musician, performer of chaâbi music
- Khelifa Belkacem, singer
- Hadj Bouchiba, songwriter, lyricist, composer, poet and painter
- Mohamed Boumerdassi, singer
- Abdelkader Chaou, chaabi music interpreter
- Reda Doumaz, singer
- El Hachemi Guerouabi, musician and reformer of the Chaabi classical style
- Dahmane El Harrachi, singer, composer and songwriter of Chaabi music
- Cheikh El Hasnaoui, singer
- Hsissen, singer
- Warda Al-Jazairia, singer
- Hadj Menouar, singer
- Kamel Messaoudi, performer of chaâbi music
- Hadj M'rizek, songwriter, lyricist, composer, poet and painter
- Tarik O'Regan, musician, Irish father and Algerian mother
- Mustapha Skandrani, pianist, performer of chaâbi music
- Mustapha Toumi, songwriter

=== Contemporary ===
- DJ Snake, DJ, producer, songwriter; French-Algerian artist, worked with several famous artists
- Indila, French-Algerian singer
- Marina Kaye, singer, French father and Algerian mother
- Lolo Zouaï, American singer, born to a French mother and an Algerian father
- Slimane, French singer

=== Jazz ===
- Franck Amsallem, jazz pianist, arranger, composer and singer
- Michel Benita, double bass player
- Mohamed Rouane, Casbah-jazz, mondol player
- Martial Solal, jazz pianist and composer

=== Musiques du monde ===
- Mohamed Abdennour (Ptit Moh) composer, arranger, instrumentalist, variety of musical forms, Algerian mandole player
- Djamel Laroussi, singer, composer, songwriter, arranger and guitar player
- Cheb i Sabbah, DJ and composer/producer

=== Pop ===
- Baaziz, singer
- Daniel Lévi, singer-songwriter, composer, and pianist
- Enrico Macias (Gaston Ghrenassia), singer
- Souad Massi, singer
- Line Monty (Eliane Sarfati), singer
- Rajae El Mouhandiz, Dutch/Moroccan/Algerian singer, recording artist, storyteller and poet
- Zaho, singer

=== Rai ===
- Messaoud Bellemou, raï musician, one of the most influential musicians of modern raï
- Safy Boutella, musician, composer
- Faudel, raï musician
- Cheb Hasni, raï musician
- Khaled, raï musician, also known as Khaled El Hadj Brahim
- Cheb Mami, raï musician, also known as Mohamed Khelifati
- Raïna Raï, band
- Cheikha Rimitti, rai musician
- Rachid Taha, raï–rock musician
- Cheb Tarik, raï musician

=== Rap ===
- Boef, Algerian rapper; one of the Netherlands' most successful rappers
- Didine Canon 16
- Double Kanon, rapper, MC, producer, songwriter; songs engaging tracks against political system
- Kenza Farah, Algerian singer-songwriter, rap, R&B and hip-hop; sings in French
- Fianso, Franco-Algerian rapper
- Lacrim, French-Algerian rapper, songwriter, has many hits in French game and American game
- L'Algerino, singer and rapper
- PNL, acronym of Peace N' Lovés, rap duo composed of two brothers: Ademo & N.O.S.
- Soolking, Algerian singer and rapper; incorporates reggae, soul, hip hop and Algerian raï in his music
- Soso Maness, rapper

=== Rock ===
- Rachid Taha, singer, musician
- Marc Zermati, producer and promoter of punk rock music

== Religious figures ==
- Abdelkader El Djezairi, religious and military leader, Islamic scholar and Sufi
- Augustine of Hippo, Christian theologian
- Saint Monica, Early Christian matron and mother of Saint Augustine
- Donatus Magnus, Leader of the Donatist Christian sect
- Ahmad al-Alawi, Founder of the Sufi Alawiyya order
- Abdul Baqi Miftah, Sunni Muslim scholar and writer
- Sidi M'hamed Bou Qobrine, founder of the Rahmaniyya Sufi order
- Ahmad al-Tijani, founder of the Tijaniyyah Sufi order
- Hud ibn Muhakkam al-Hawwari, Ibadi Quran exegete
- Abd al-Rahman al-Tha'alibi, Arab scholar and imam
- Abu Madyan, influential mystic and Sufi master
- Sidi El Houari, imam and a saint of Oran
- Muhammad ibn Ali al-Sanusi, founder of the Senussi Order
- Makhluf al-Balbali, Islamic scholar
- Abd al-Rahman al-Waghlisi, Muslim scholar author mufti and an imam born in 1303

== Scholars and academics ==
=== Historians ===
- Annie Cohen-Solal, writer, historian, cultural diplomat and public intellectual
- Ibn Hammad, medieval historian
- Mohamed Harbi, independence war historian
- Évariste Lévi-Provençal, medievalist, orientalist, Arabist, and historian of Islam
- Ahmed Mohammed al-Maqqari, Algerian historian born in the 16th century

=== Linguistics ===
- Mohamed Bencheneb, 19th-century linguist and historian
- Abderrahmane Hadj-Salah, 20th-century linguist and president of the Algerian Academy of the Arabic Language
- Saïd Cid Kaoui, 19th-century lexicographer and interpreter focusing on Berber
- Judah ibn Kuraish, 9th-century Algerian grammarian and lexicographer focusing on Hebrew
- Mouloud Mammeri, 20th-century anthropologist, linguist, poet, writer
- Ibn Muti al-Zawawi, 13th-century Algerian grammarian focusing on Arabic

=== Science ===
- Maamar Bettayeb, control theorist and systems scientist
- Mohamed Belhocine, internal medicine and epidemiology researcher
- Mustapha Ishak Boushaki, cosmologist and relativity researcher
- Rachid Deriche, computational imaging researcher
- Noureddine Melikechi, atomic, molecular, and optical physicist researcher
- Elias Zerhouni, radiologist and medical researcher
- Azzedine Bousseksou, physical chemist, and molecular materials and spintronics researcher

=== Philosophy ===
- Mohamed Arkoun, author, philosopher, historian
- Malek Bennabi, social and religious philosopher
- Frantz Fanon, psychologist
- Mohamed Lakhdar Maougal, philosopher

== Sports ==
=== Association football ===
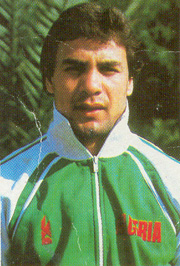
Rabah Madjer

- Lakhdar Belloumi, footballer; World Cup participation in 1982, 1986
- Djamel Belmadi, coach, former footballer
- Said Belmokhtar, Kazakhstani-born Ukrainian footballer of Algerian descent
- Zahir Belounis, footballer
- Saïd Benrahma, footballer
- Said Brahimi, footballer; one of the founders of the Algerian football team
- Ali Fergani, footballer and trainer
- Rabah Gamouh, international footballer
- Adlene Guedioura, footballer and African champion
- Abdelhamid Kermali, footballer; one of the founders of the Algerian football team
- Mahieddine Khalef, footballer and trainer
- Mustapha Khedali), footballer
- Rabah Madjer, footballer; played in two World Cup games with Algeria, European champion with Porto
- Riyad Mahrez, footballer; played in one World Cup
- Raïs M'Bolhi, Algerian goalkeeper
- Rachid Mekhloufi, footballer; one of the founders of the Algerian football team
- Yahia Ouahabi, retired player for JS Kabylie
- Islam Slimani, Algerian national footballer; (World Cup 2014)
- Abdelaziz Ben Tifour, footballer; one of the founders of the Algerian football team
- Mohamed Yahi, footballer for JS Kabylie and NA Hussein Dey
- Karim Ziani, Algerian national footballer; World Cup participation in 2010

=== Athletics ===
- Hassiba Boulmerka, athlete; 1500 m world and Olympic champion
- Taoufik Makhloufi, athlete; 1500 m Olympic champion
- Nouria Mérah-Benida, athlete; 1500 m Olympic champion
- Noureddine Morceli, athlete; 1500 m world and Olympic champion
- Artur Partyka, Polish high jumper; father is Algerian

=== Basketball ===
- Abdesslem Dekkiche

=== Boxing ===
- Abdelhafid Benchabla, boxer
- Amine Boushaki, judoka
- Robert Cohen, world-champion bantamweight boxer
- Lahouari Godih
- Alphonse Halimi ("la Petite Terreur"), world-champion bantamweight boxer
- Myriam Lamare, boxer, French father and Algerian mother
- Mohamed Missouri, boxer

=== Fencing ===
- Tahar Hamou, foil fencer
- Anissa Khelfaoui, foil fencer
- Armand Mouyal (1925–1988), French world champion épée fencer
- Ferial Salhi, foil fencer
- Michel Sebastiani, modern pentathlete and Olympic fencing coach

=== Ice hockey ===
- Josef Boumedienne, professional ice hockey player; Algerian and Finnish descent

=== Judo ===
- Hassane Azzoun, Algerian judoka
- Sami Belgroun, Algerian judoka
- Abderahmane Benamadi, Algerian judoka
- Mounir Benamadi, Algerian judoka
- Amar Benikhlef, Algerian judoka
- Mohamed Bouaichaoui, Algerian judoka
- Faycal Bousbiat, Algerian judoka
- Amine Boushaki, Algerian judoka
- Lyès Bouyacoub, Algerian judoka
- Khaled Meddah, Algerian judoka
- Amar Meridja, Algerian judoka
- Omar Rebahi, Algerian judoka
- Mohamed-Amine Tayeb, Algerian judoka
- Noureddine Yagoubi, Algerian judoka
- Houd Zourdani, Algerian judoka

=== Other sports ===
- Ali Boulala, professional skateboarder; Algerian and Swedish descent
- Ines Ibbou, tennis player
- Alfred Nakache, swimmer and water polo player
- Esraa Warda, dancer

== See also ==
- List of people by nationality
