= List of Algerians of Turkish origin =

This is a list of notable Algerian people of full or partial ethnic Turkish origin.

== Academia ==
- Djelloul Benkalfate educator and socialist (family of Turkish origin)
- Abdelhalim Bensmaia, Islamic scholar (family of Turkish origin)
- Abdelhalim Ben Smaya, scholar (family of Turkish origin)
- Hamdan Khodja, scholar and merchant (father of Turkish origin)
- Ibn Hamza al-Maghribi, Algerian mathematician (Turkish mother)
- Malek Bennabi, writer and philosopher (Turkish great-grandfather)

== Arts ==
- Hacène Benaboura, artist (family of Turkish origin)
- Ali Ali Khodja, painter (family of Turkish origin; nephew of the Racim brothers)
- Mohamed-Réda Benabdallah Khodja, artist (from a Constantinian family of Turkish origin)
- Mohammed Racim, artist (from an Algerine family of Turkish origin)
- Omar Racim, artist and writer (from an Algerine family of Turkish origin)

== Cinema ==
- Isabelle Adjani, Algerian-French actress (Algerian father of Turkish origin and German mother)
- Ahmed Magdy, Algerian-Egyptian actor (paternal grandmother of Turkish origin)

== Literature ==
- Mohamed Bencheneb, writer (ancestors from Bursa)
- Lakhdar Ben Cherif, poet (mother of Turkish origin)
- Slimane Bengui, director of the first French-language Algerian newspaper "El Hack" (family of Turkish origin)
- Ahmed Ben-Triki ("Ben Zengli"), poet (father of Turkish origin)
- Leïla Chellabi, writer (Algerian father of Turkish origin)
- Mustapha Haciane, poet (family of Turkish origin)
- Leïla Sebbar, writer (paternal grandmother from an old Ténès family of Turkish origin)
- Wassyla Tamzali, writer (family of Turkish and Spanish origin)

== Medicine ==
- Ben Lerbey, possibly the first Algerian doctor (from an old Algerine family of Turkish origin)

== Military ==
- Benali Boudghène, resistance fighter (family of Turkish origin)
- Abdelmalek Mohieddine, officer (claimed to be from Turkey)

== Music ==
- Mahieddine Bachtarzi, actor and singer (from a bourgeois family of Turkish origin)
- Mustapha Benkhemmar, master of Andalusian music (family of Turkish origin)
- Larbi Bensari, master of Andalusian music (was a Kouloughli)
- Abdelkrim Dali (fr), musician
- Salim Halali, singer (father of Turkish origin and mother of Judeo-Berber origin)
- Mustapha Nador, musician (Turkish origin)
- Hadj Sameer, French musician (Algerian-Turkish origin)
- Mustapha Skandrani, pianist, performer of chaâbi music (family from İskenderun)
- Mohamed Sfinja, master of Andalusian music
- Boualem Titiche, master of the zurna (father of Turkish origin)

== Politics ==
- Ghemati Abdelkrim, high-ranking leader of the Islamic Salvation Front (family of Turkish origin)
- Benaouda Hadj Hacène Bachterzi, municipal councilor in Oran; founder of the "Es-Sandjak" ("l’Etandard") and "Le cri indigene" newspapers (belonged to one of the oldest Algerian-Turkish families)
- Mohammed Saleh Bendjelloul, co-founder of the Federation of Elected Natives (native of Constantine and of Turkish origin)
- Benyoucef Benkhedda, headed the third GPRA exile government of the National Liberation Front; acted as a leader during the Algerian War (1954–62) (family of Turkish origin)
- Lakhdar Ben-Tobbal, resistance fighter (father of Turkish origin)
- Abderrahmane Berrouane, politician (mother of Arab and Turkish origin)
- Ahmed Chaouch, caïd (father of Turkish origin)
- Ahmed Bey, the last Bey of Constantine (Turkish father and Arab mother)
- Ahmed Ben Messali Hadj, often called the "father" of Algerian nationalism (father of Turkish origin)
- Mourad Kaouah, Deputy of Algiers (1958–62), French politician, and football player (Turkish origin)
- Hasan Pasha, three-times Beylerbey of the Regency of Algiers
- Kaddour Sator, drew up the Algerian Nationality Code after Algerian independence; Deputy of Constanine (1946) (from one of the old Algerian families of origin Turkish)
- Chérif Sid-Cara, doctor and politician in the French Fourth Republic (from an old Algerian family of Turkish origin)
- Nafissa Sid-Cara, first female minister to serve in the French Fifth Republic and the first ever Muslim woman to serve as a minister in a French government (from an old Algerian family of Turkish origin)
- Mustapha Stambouli, nationalist leader (family of Turkish origin)

== Sports ==
- Patrick Abada, French pole vaulter and Olympian (from an old Algerian family of Turkish origin)
- Omar Benmahmoud Ali Raïs, sportsman (Turkish origin)
- Benjamin Stambouli, French professional footballer for Schalke 04, Algerian father of Turkish origin (Henri Stambouli)

== See also ==
- Turks in Algeria
- Kouloughlis
- List of governors and rulers of the Regency of Algiers
- List of beys of Constantine, Algeria
