= Maamar =

Maamar is a masculine given name and surname of Arabic origin. Notable people with the name include:

== Given name ==
- Maamar Bengriba (born 1982), Algerian long-distance swimmer
- Maamar Benguerba, Algerian politician
- Maamar Bettayeb (born 1953), Algerian control theorist, educator and inventor
- Maamar Mamouni (born 1976), Algerian footballer
- Maâmar Ousser (1935–2023), Algerian footballer
- Maâmar Youcef (born 1989), Algerian footballer

== Surname ==
- Ali Maamar (born 2005), Moroccan footballer
- Lassaad Maamar (born 1968), Tunisian footballer
- Nora Hamou Maamar (born 1983), Algerian footballer

== See also ==
- Maamor, Hebrew expression meaning "teaching/lesson/discourse"
- Maamarim (Chabad), texts in Chabad Hasidism
