= Miloud =

Miloud (Arabic: ميلود) is a masculine given name which refers to the birth of the Prophet of Islam Muhamed El Mawlid Ennabawi (and deriving from the latter). In the Middle East the name is Miled, with the same root. This name is mainly used in Maghreb (the North African subregion), and by families of North African descent in Europe, especially in France. It is a custom to give a son the name Miloud or Miled if he happens to be born on the day of the Prophet's Birth. A feminine variant of this name, Milouda, has appeared, mostly in Maghreb and Europe. Notable people with the name include:

== Given name ==
=== Miled ===
- Miled Faiza (born 1974), Tunisian-American writer

=== Miloud ===
- Miloud Abaoub (born 1977), Algerian runner
- Miloud Mourad Benamara (born 1977), Algerian-born Italian actor
- Miloud Chaabi (1930–2016), Moroccan businessman and politician
- Miloud Hadefi (1949–1994), Algerian footballer and manager
- Miloud Hamdi (born 1971), Algerian-French football manager
- Miloud Hmida (born 1980), Algerian poet
- Miloud Khetib (1945–2025), Algerian-born French actor
- Miloud Mahfoud (born 1985), Algerian footballer
- Miloud M'Sellek (born 1937), Moroccan gymnast
- Miloud Rahmani (born 1982), Algerian Olympic athlete
- Miloud Rebiaï (born 1993), Algerian footballer
- Miloud Zakka, Libyan volleyball player
