= El Kettar Cemetery =

Cemetery in Algeria

Coordinates: 36°47′07″N 3°02′58″E

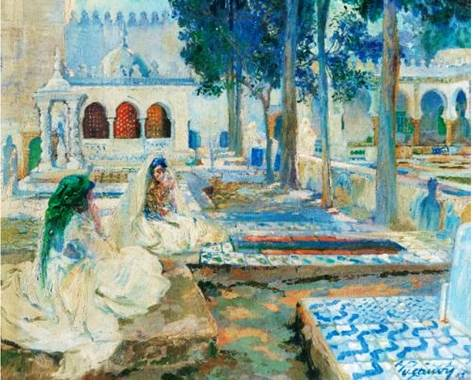
Women in the El Kettar Cemetery, by Léon Cauvy

El Kettar Cemetery (Arabic: مقبرة القطار) is one of the most famous cemeteries in Algeria. It is situated in a suburb of the city of Algiers in the commune of Oued Koriche. It opened in 1838 replacing the cemetery of Sidi Abderrahmane destroyed in 1830. It was previously known as Dar El Ghrib (the unknown's residence) since foreigners of the city's limit were buried there. The current name, El Kettar (distillery in Arabic), is due to the distillation of jasmine in the Bridja, a funeral monument dating from the Ottoman era. It was built on a steep hill cemetery, because at the time of colonization, the French authorities forbade Muslims to bury their dead in flat terrain.

It comprises tombs of numerous Algerian notables and it is one of the most preferred place for actors and actresses and other artists (opera singers, musicians, painters, sculptors, architects, writers, poets). It also includes the tombs of several scientists, academicians and sportspeople.

The cemetery also contains paintings by Émile Gaudissard.

== Notable interments ==
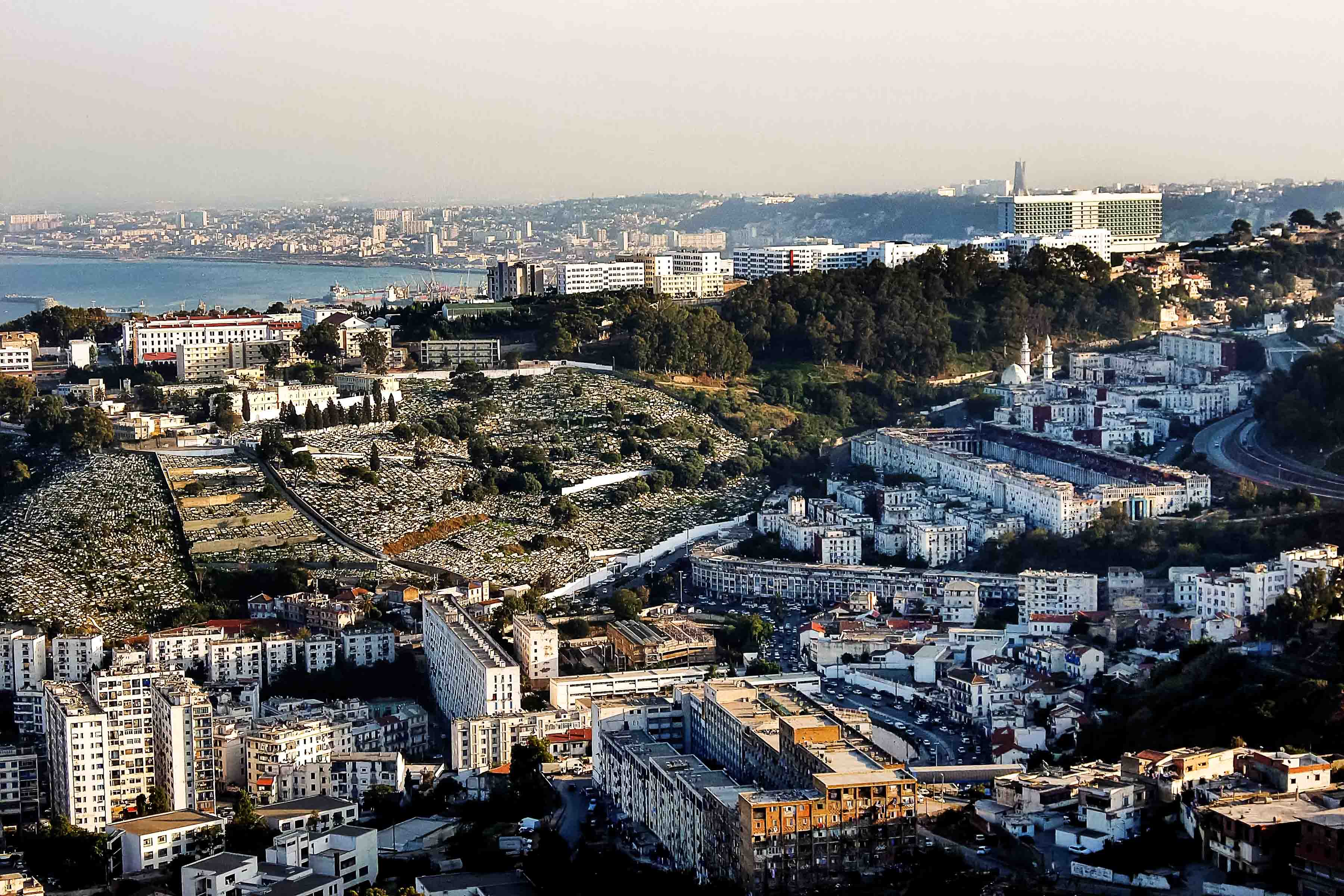
El Kettar Cemetery

- Mohamed Bourenane, politician and martyr.
- Arezki Louni, politician and martyr.
- Yacef Saâdi, actor and freedom fighter.
- El Hadj M'Hamed El Anka, singer and composer.
- Mustapha El Anka, musician and actor.
- Dahmane El Harrachi, singer.
- Amar Ezzahi, singer and mandole player.
- Fadela Dziria, singer.
- Hadj M'rizek, singer.
- Hadj Bouchiba, musician.
- Hsissen, singer
- Hamdane Sfindja, sports journalist.
- Mohamed Hattab a.k.a. Habib Réda, basketball player, actor and revolutionary
- Mustapha Toumi, composer
- Marie-Josèphe Dublé, wife of Frantz Fanon
- Rouiched, actor.
- Mohamed Boudia, activist, playwright and journalist.
- Rachid Ksentini, actor and singer
- Kaddour Belkaïm, secretary of the Algerian Communist Party
- Bachir Ridouh, psychiatrist
- Redouane Osmane, trade unionist
- Djamel Keddou, football player
- Kheireddine Ameyar, founder of La Tribune newspaper.
- Allal Ouaguenouni, football player
- Arezki Hammoutène, athlete
- Mouloud Djazouli, leader of the MC Alger

Note: This list is very far from complete: the number of notables buried here exceeds 10,000.

== Bibliography ==
- Boutalbi, Mohamed (1986). Le Cimetière d'El Kettar: regard sur un espace funéraire (in French). Algiers. p. 304.

== See also ==
- Cemeteries of Algiers
