= Fadhéla Dziria =

Algerian singer

- Born: 25 June 1917; Algiers
- Died: 6 October 1970
- Citizenship: Algeria, France
- Occupations: Singer, actor, writer, playwright

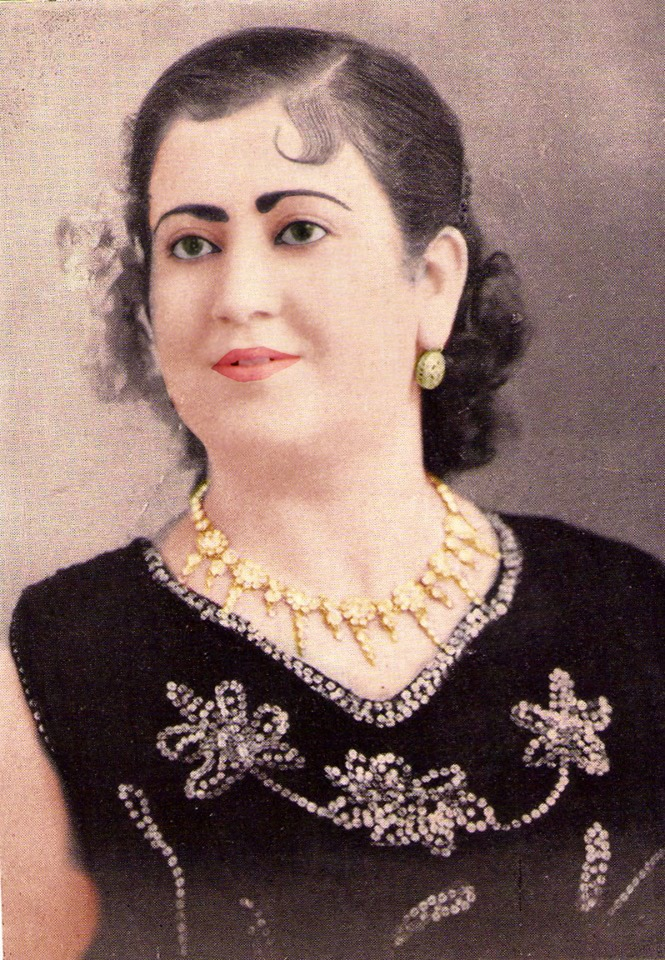
Fadhéla Dziria

Fadhéla Dziria, officially Fadhéla Madani Bent el-Mahdi (25 June 1917 – 6 October 1970) was an Algerian singer in the Hawzi style of Andalusian classical music. Her first name is also seen as Fadila, Fadhila, or Fadela, and her chosen last name as Dziriya. Dziria means Algerian—so she was, professionally, "Fadhéla the Algerian".

== Career ==
Fadhéla Dziria was born in Algiers, the daughter of Mehdi Ben Abderrahmane and Fettouma Khelfaoui. She was first heard singing on the radio in Algeria. In the 1930s, she was a young cabaret singer in Paris. She returned to Algeria, and sang at the Cafe des Sports. She began making recordings in the 1940s, mostly of traditional folk songs. She toured to sing in other cities, and appeared in films. Later in her career, she was also seen on television.

She raised funds for political causes with her more militant sister, Goucem Madani (1918-1983), and served time in prison for her activism. The sisters had a band with Sultana Daoud.

Fadhéla Dziria is said to have been an important influence on Saloua, another Algerian traditional singer. She also provided early opportunities for singer-songwriter Biyouna, who played the tambourine in Dziria's all-female orchestra as a young woman.

== Personal life ==
Fadhéla Madani was married for a short time at age 13. She died in 1970, aged 53 years. Her gravesite is in El Kettar Cemetery.

== Legacy ==
In 2009, an amphitheater at the National Institute of Music in Algiers was named for Dziria. An annual national music festival is held there. In 2010 there was a gathering of musicians in Algiers to mark the fortieth anniversary of her death, and to open a photography exhibition based on her music.

In 1999, the song "Dziria" by the Algerian hip-hop band MBS sampled Fadila Dziria's 1951 recording of "Ana Touiri".
