= Hichem Aboud =

Algerian journalist and political activist

- هشام عبود
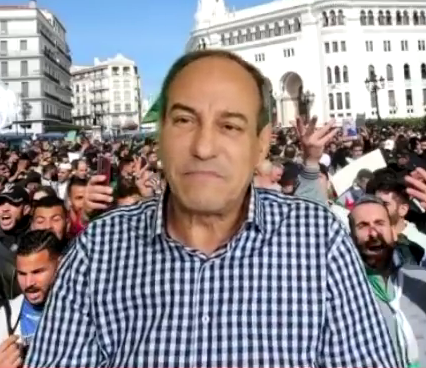
- Aboud in 2021
- Born: 15 June 1955 (age 71); Bab El Oued, Algiers
- Education: Algiers 1 University
- Occupations: Journalist; activist
- Military career
- Allegiance: Algeria
- Branch: Algerian People's National Army

Hichem Aboud (Arabic: هشام عبود, romanized: hišhām ʿabuwd, born 15 June 1955) is an Algerian journalist and political activist. Aboud was the founder and redactor-in-chief of the "Mon Journal" (Arabic: جريدتي, romanized: jarīdatī, lit. 'My Journal') newspaper. The newspaper was published in both French and Arabic. In 2013, the journal was banned in Algeria after reporting on Algerian president Abdelaziz Bouteflika's health. As of 2023, Aboud has over 613,000 subscribers on YouTube.

== Early life ==
Hichem Aboud was born in a Chaoui family on 15 June 1955 in Bab El Oued, Algiers. Aboud enrolled in the Algerian People's National Army in 1975. Aboud received a Diploma from the Institute of Political Science and Information at Algiers 1 University in 1978.

== Career ==
Aboud started his journalism career in 1977 as a freelance writer for Jeunesse Action and La République, He later became the Algiers bureau chief for El-Hadef, a journal specialized in sports.

In 1979, Aboud became the redactor-in-chief of El-Djeïch, the People's National Army's official publication. Aboud became Mohamed Betchine's chief of staff in 1987, at the time, Betchine was the director of the Délégation Générale à la Prévention et à la Sécurité, the Algerian military intelligence service. During his work as Betchine's chief of staff, Aboud still contributed to El-Hadef under a pseudonym. He left the army on 16 October 1992. He created an independent journal covering Eastern Algeria named El-Acil, the journal was banned in 1993 for its fierce criticism of the government. After moving to Constantine in 1994, Aboud launched another publication named Le Libre, the publication was banned after five months following criticism of the military and government. In 1995, Aboud became the Algiers correspondent for Le Quotidien de Paris, his accreditation was withdrawn by the Algerian Ministry of Foreign Affairs.

He was granted political asylum in France in 1997 where he released a book in 2002 named "The Mafia of Generals" (French: La Mafia des Généraux). In the book, which he created with the goal of "breaking the omerta", he denounces the Algerian government as a "political and military mafia". He created two magazines while in France, Racines d'Outre-Méd in 2004 and Repères Maghrébins in 2009. He renounced his political refugee status in 2011 and returned to Algeria.

He created a journal named "Mon Journal" (Arabic: جريدتي, romanized: jarīdatī, lit. 'My Journal') in 2011. The journal was banned in Algeria after a story was published about Abdelaziz Bouteflika's coma and hospitalisation in France. Aboud was banned from exiting Algerian territory by a judge after being found guilty of "undermining national security, territorial integrity and the proper functioning of state institutions".

He fled to France through Tunisia on 10 August 2013. Abdessami' Abdelhaï was subsequently arrested for allegedly assisting. He is currently living in France under a ten-year resident card. He created a Swiss-based TV channel in 2018 named Amel TV, the channel broadcast from France through IPTV and Satellite, Amel TV went bankrupt the same year due to lack of funding. He created a YouTube channel named "Aboud Hichem TV" on 10 May 2018.

In February 2020, Aboud was sentenced in absentia to 10 years in prison by a court in Tébessa for "illegal immigration" on charges relating to his 2013 escape to France. In April 2021, Aboud was sentenced to seven years in prison by a courtroom in Chéraga for "disclosing confidential information" for reporting on Khaled Nezzar and his arrest warrant in Switzerland for crimes against humanity. A court in Bir Mourad Raïs issued an arrest warrant against Aboud for charges relating to his alleged involvement in the Rachad movement, which the Algerian government named a terrorist group. An international arrest warrant was issued later that year, however, France has refused to extradite him to Algeria.

The charges against Aboud caused protest in Algeria, where protestors repeatedly chanted that "Hicham Aboud, [is a] free journalist" (Arabic: هشام عبود صحفي حر, romanized: hišhām ʿeabuwd ṣaḥafy ḥurun). His name was published on the Algerian government's national list of terrorist entities in February 2022, the list was taken offline from their website the next day. Aboud denies all of these accusations.

== Kidnapping incident ==
In 2022, Aboud alleged that he was the victim of an assassination plot in Brussels, Aboud reportedly pressed charges against people he believes were responsible in the plot. In October 2024, Aboud was kidnapped by two hooded men at Barcelona-El Prat Airport after taking a flight from Brussels. He was rescued days later and found tied up in a boat crossing the Guadalquivir by the Guardia Civil in Lebrija, 900 km away from Barcelona, two suspects were arrested.

== Bibliography ==
- Aboud, Hichem (2002). La mafia des généraux (in French). Paris: Lattès. ISBN 978-2-7096-2337-7. OCLC 49382731.
