= Hadj Bouchiba =

El Hadj Bouchiba
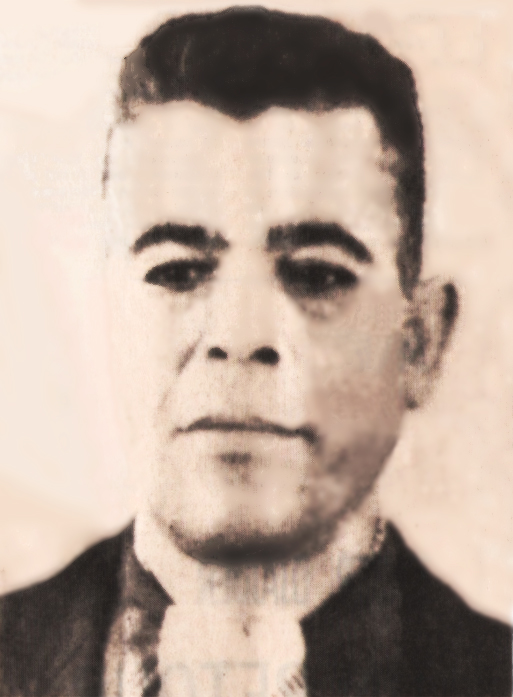

Background information
- Born: Abdelghani Bouchiba; 1903; Algiers, Algeria
- Died: January 5, 1957 (aged 53–54) Algiers, Algeria
- Genres: Chaabi
- Occupations: Singer, musician (Arabic, French)

Hadj Bouchiba (1903 – January 5, 1957) was an Algerian songwriter, lyricist, composer, poet and painter.

== Biography ==
Abdelghani Bouchiba was born in Constantine in 1903 but moved when very young to Algiers with his father, Salah, who had two Arabic style shoe stores in the Casbah of Algiers (rue Médée and rue Randon). In 1923 he lived with his parents in Rampe Valée. He was called to do his military service in the Navy and after his demobilization worked in tobacco at Ets Azoulay then at Job, first as a mechanic and later Machine driver. After finishing the service, Bouchiba devoted himself with much more determination to music, from 1924 to 1925. His fledging in the art were those received by the master Mustapha Nador with whom he worked for a short timeon tenor banjo. It was especially in the neighborhood "El Koudia" in the Casbah that Bouchiba had time to learn from another musician Lounès Kamissa who held at the same time a tavern frequented by youngsters of the Casbah. Two other places also previously served Bouchiba to ensure beneficial repetitions, one provided by Ayad Kehioudji (Mohand Erroumi), Hadj M'rizek's half-brother a trusted name and a man versed in this art in Bab-El-Djedid, and the other at Hadj Sellili's, both in the upper Casbah. During the same period in 1932–33, Bouchiba managed two coffees: one in Belachère street at the "Souikia" of Hadj Slimane and the other "El Koudia" in association with Kehioudi and other well-known figure of Algiers Hadj Brahim who himself had some time managed the café de la Pêcherie, a much preferred place by secure customers.

After a debut in the "medh chaabi" genre gradually Bouchiba opted for "El Arrobi" which was to lead him to a higher stage and admired by people from the "Fahs" (Sahel) where Bouchiba occupied a prominent place.

Bouchiba studied at the Brahim Fatah school in Arabic and French under the direction of master Fatah himself in El Koudia where Abdelghani at an early age had manifested exceptional intelligence both inside and outside of school. Around 1935–36, Bouchida made a Hadj after his pilgrimage to the Holy Places of Islam (Mecca). He had made the trip as an employee on a boat convoy. In these same years, Hadj Bouchida had climbed the echelons in his profession, he became very sought and found thanks to his serious and regular work. Bouchida had a chosen clientele did not work for the first applicant but only for those who appreciated his art.

On January 5, 1957, at 19 o'clock Bouchiba fall under the bullets of La Main Rouge a colonial secret organization. He was buried at the El Kettar Cemetery.

== Songs ==
- Mahl El Djoudi
- Ya akhina
- Ya Doukar Edjnani
- Sbouhi

== Bibliography ==
- Bendamèche, Abdelkader (2006). Un artiste de légende (in French). Algiers: Éditions de la bibliothèque nationale d'Algérie. p. 55.
