= Miloud Chaabi =

Moroccan businessman and politician

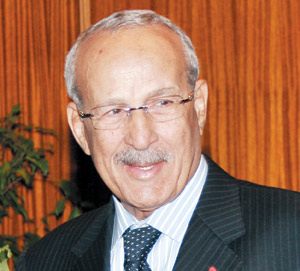
- Born: ميلود الشعبي; 15 September 1930; Mzilate, Morocco
- Died: 16 April 2016 (aged 85); Hamburg, Germany
- Occupations: Businessman; politician
- Known for: Wealthiest person in Morocco in 2011
- Children: 8

Miloud Chaabi (Arabic: ميلود الشعبي; 15 September 1930 – 16 April 2016) was a Moroccan businessman and politician. He was the founder of Ynna Holding and the owner of the Riad Mogador hotel chain and group of supermarkets Aswak Assalam in Morocco. He was known for his strong stance against alcohol which is banned from both his hotel chain and supermarkets. His daughter, Asma Chaâbi has been mayor of the city of Essaouira from 2003 to 2009, and was the first woman to hold such a position in Morocco. His son, Mohcine, is a current member of the House of Representatives, while his late son Mohamed and his other son Faouzi, held the same positions in the past. He was also the parliamentary representative of Essaouira after winning the elections in 2011, until he resigned on December 8, 2014 due to his declining health. His seat in the parliament was taken by his daughter Asma, who was second on the electoral list.

In 2011, his fortune was estimated by Forbes Magazine at some $3 billion which made him the sixth richest man in Africa at the time, and the wealthiest person in Morocco.

Chaâbi was also known for his philanthropic and charity work and donated 10% of his fortune to build the first American university in Morocco in conjunction with the Indiana State University, Terre Haute, Indiana. He was the operator of one of the largest charity organisations in Morocco, the Miloud Chaâbi Foundation.

== Biography ==
Miloud Chaabi was born in Mzilate, a small Berber village near Essaouira, Morocco, to a poor family. As a child he was taught in a mosque, and started working alternatively as a goat herder and farmer. During his brief time at school, he learned the Koran and the basics of reading and writing. At 15, he saved up enough money and moved from Marrakesh to Kenitra where he started his first construction company in 1948.

At a time when trading business in Kenitra was restricted to the French, some Jewish businessmen, and some of the well known Moroccan families, Chaâbi ventured into the field. His interest went toward the ceramic industry which made him start his own ceramic company in 1964.

Soon, Chaâbi gained enough experience in the business and began to seek for opportunities to purchase large companies. He offered to become an investor in a French company but the company refused his offer, which drove him to keep pressuring it by selling products with competitive prices until it had finally collapsed and was on the verge of bankruptcy. In 1985, the company sold all of its properties to Chaâbi himself. This success was a turning point for Chaâbi's professional career, and as a result he founded Ynna Group which became one of the most powerful holding companies in Morocco.

In 1992, he founded JBC for cardboard paper and got a deal for the sale of the petrochemical company SNEP in 1993. In 1994, he launched ELECTRA for electrical components, cables and television batteries. In 1998, he launched Aswak Assalam shopping chain which was followed by the launch of Riyad Mogador hotel chain in 1999.

== Political career ==
Until he resigned in 2014, Miloud Chaabi won all Moroccan parliamentary elections since 1984, though he changed his political party multiple times. Parties of which he was a member include Party of Progress and Socialism and Environment and Development Party. In July 2008, he heavily criticized Driss Jettou's government for selling public properties at low prices without taking the proper legal procedures.

== See also ==
- Othman Benjelloun
- Anas Sefrioui
- Aziz Akhannouch
