= Mustapha Skandrani =

- Born: 17 November 1920; Algiers, French Algeria
- Died: 18 October 2005 (aged 84) Algiers, Algeria
- Genres: Chaabi, Andalusian classical music
- Occupations: Musician, pianist

Mustapha Skandrani (17 November 1920 in the Lower Casbah, Algiers – 8 October 2005) was an Algerian pianist, performer of chaâbi music.

== Early life ==
Born in 1920, in the Casbah of Algiers, in Algeria, Skandrani's family were of Turkish origin and originally came from Iskander, Turkey. Indeed, his family surname "Skandrani" is a Turkish origin surname used in Algeria by families from İskenderun.

He grew up and studied until the elementary certificate without problem in the secular Casbah.

== Career ==
Skandrani made his radio debut with the composer Rachid Ksentini and his partner Marie Soussan. That was followed by a tour of Algeria in 1940 with Umm Kulthum, Mahieddine Bachtarzi, Driscar, Mustapha Kateb and others. On his return from tour, he accompanied all the stars who attended concerts among other Dahmane Ben Achour, El Hadj Menouar and the dean of Chaabi music El Hadj M'Hamed El Anka. As a conductor of the concert part, Skandrani was present in 46 creations of the Arab Theatre of the Opera of Algiers.

In 1956, musicologist El Boudali Safir assigned Skandrani to the modern orchestra as a replacement for El Hadj M'Hamed El Anka. He was also the soloist in the classical orchestra commissioned to Abderrazak Fakhardji, a position he held until the independence of Algeria, combining its radio business with interests in the emerging television.

Beginning in 1938, Skandrani composed over 300 modern compositions or chaâbi and 187 qasida and ditties including "Youm El Djemaa", "El Haraz", "Kifechhilti", "Qahoua ou lateye", "A bouya Hnini" "A laini filaati. " From 1966 to 1981, he was a teacher at the Conservatory of Algiers and served as director from 1981.

He died on 8 October 2005 at the age of 85 at his home in Algiers after a long illness. He is buried at the Sidi M'hamed Cemetery.

== Discography ==
- Touchia (1963 EP, Pathé)
- Stikhbar (1965 LP, Pathé)
- Khlassat (1965 LP, Pathé)
- Le Piano Dans La Musique Arabe (1992 Compilation, Artistes Arabes Associés)
- Les Virtuoses (1993 Compilation, Artistes Arabes Associés)
