= Ahmed El Ghazi =

Algerian politician

Wali of Tizi Ouzou Province
- In office January 30, 1984 – July 26, 1989
- Preceded by: Hamid Sidi Said
- Succeeded by: Abdelmadjid Tebboune

9th wali of Algiers Province
- In office January 26, 1980 – January 30, 1984
- Preceded by: Daho Ould Kablia
- Succeeded by: Chaâbane Aït Abderrahim

Wali of Guelma Province
- In office September 1, 1978 – January 26, 1980
- Succeeded by: Abderrahamane Baazizi

Personal details
- Party: FLN

Ahmed El Ghazi was an Algerian politician who served as wali of the Algerian provinces of Tébessa, M'Sila, Guelma, Algiers, and Tizi Ouzou between 1974 and 1989.

== Biography ==
El Ghazi's first role as a politician was as the wali of Tébessa Province, which began on September 1, 1974, and ended in 1976. El Ghazi's subsequent tenure as wali of M'Sila province ended on August 31, 1978. He then served as wali of Guelma Province from September 1, 1978, to January 26, 1980. From 1980 to 1984, El Ghazi served as wali of Algiers Province, and then served as wali of Tizi Ouzou Province from 1984 to 1989.
