= Khelifa Belkacem =

- Also known as: Cheikh Khelifa Belkacem
- Born: 1907; Koléa, Algeria
- Origin: El Hamel
- Died: November 4, 1951 (aged 43–44) Algiers, Algeria
- Genre: Chaabi
- Occupations: Composer, singer, conductor
- Instruments: Mandole

Khelifa Belkacem (1907 – November 4, 1951) was an Algerian singer.

== Biography ==
Khelifa Belkacem was born in 1907 in Koléa. His family moved to Staouéli near Algiers in 1911. At the age of nine he becomes fatherless. In 1935 he moves to Algiers which then housed prestigious names of the chaâbi chanson like El Hadj M'Hamed El Anka. He had learned the music profession in the streets of Staouéli. He wanted to compete with the giants of the era: El Hadj Menouar, Hadj Bouchiba, Hadj M'rizek and succeeded by starting up a young band to enliven family celebrations around Algiers.

To penetrate into the middle of chaâbi he left Staouéli to install at the Casbah where work did not lack but where the public was difficult. His orchestra was composed of Moh Saghir Laama on oud, Belkaïd Abdelghani on alto violin, Mohamed Zerbout on darbuka, Hadj Omar on tar and Kaddour Cherchali, Mouloud Bahri and Ali Bousbia on banjos. Evenings dates at the circle of Chartres' place, or coffee "Ismailia" square Lavigerie (now up Benbadis) in the 1940s, during the holy month of Ramadan, were famous.

Persistent, passionate, rigorous. He had a melodious voice and his "Istikhbar" (musical improvisation, vocal prelude improvised at tempo rubato) was a treat. He faced the "bit siah wah" genre without complex and other more difficult pieces. His mastering the art of Chaabi influenced singers of fame like Dahmane El Harrachi or Hsissen.

He left a television recording of the song Saki Baki (filmed by the French cinema in the 1940s and adopted by many artists like El Hachemi Guerouabi) that the Algerian television transmits from time to time. Radio also broadcasts songs he interpreted like "Messaad dhek ennhar jani bachar" (by the poet Abdelouahab), "Daâni are menne lem Helti" (by the poet Benali) and "El bez ghebli."

== Death ==
He died on November 4, 1951, by bullets after a brawl at the Casbah, near his home, rue Darfour, at 44 years old. He is buried in the cemetery of Sidi M'hamed alongside Kaddour Cherchali a virtuoso banjo player that was part of his orchestra.

== Bibliography ==
- Cheurfi, Achour [in French] (1996). Mémoire algérienne : Dictionnaire biographique (in French). Algiers: Dahlab. p. 896.
