= World Deserts Foundation =

World Deserts Foundation (Fondation Deserts du Monde) is an Algerian non-governmental and intergovernmental organization. Its headquarters are located in Ghardaia, Algeria. Its mission is to promote sustainable development of desert regions.

World Deserts Foundation is one of the organizations participating on a continuing basis as the observer in the United Nations Economic and Social Council.

The Foundation has been established in 2002. It has created by the Algerian politician and then Minister of Tourism, Cherif Rahmani, as means to receive a share of funds from United Nations Development Programme allocated to the project overseen by the Algerian Ministry of Culture, as well as to provide a government-friendly, but officially independent and non-government partner for the purpose of securing funding that is not meant to be allocated to public institutions. For that reason, the Foundation has been criticized as a tool to misuse development funds and exclude proper civil society organizations who are less supportive of the government or have less ties to the current administration.
