= Malika Gaïd =

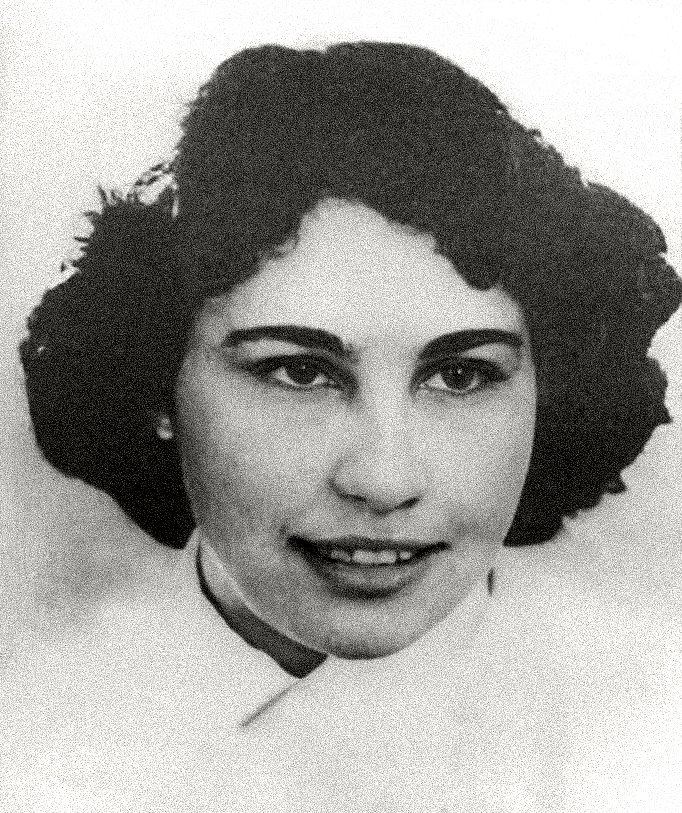
- Born: 24 August 1933; Belcourt, Algiers, Algeria
- Died: 27 June 1957 (aged 23); Near M'Chedallah, Bouïra, Algeria
- Occupations: Nurse, Freedom Fighter
- Known for: Nursing and fighting in the Algerian War of Independence
- Movement: National Liberation Army (ALN)
- Parent: Mohand Amokrane
- Awards: Commemorative postage stamp (2019)

Malika Gaïd (1933–1957) was an Algerian nurse who joined the National Liberation Army (ALN) to care for the wounded and to fight for independence from the French during the Algerian War in 1955. In June 1958, she was shot dead by a French soldier while defending the wounded in a cave near M'Chedallah. Gaïd is now remembered as one of the heroic martyrs of Algerian independence. Along with other martyrs, she was commemorated in a series of postage stamps in 2019.

== Biography ==
Born on 24 August 1933 in the Belcourt district of Algiers, Malika Gaïd was the youngest of seven children in a literate middle-class family, keen to participate in the cause for independence. Her father, Mohand Amokrane, was a schoolteacher. After completing her school education, in 1948 she trained in nursing at Sétif, earning her diploma in 1951. She worked in the hospitals of Kherrata, Guenzet and finally Bougaâ where she stayed until 1956. During this period, she secretly cared for members of the Mujahideen.

In June 1955, she was invited by Colonel Amirouche to join the soldiers of the National Liberation Army (ALN) in the Soummam Valley. In August 1956, she participated as a nurse and the only woman in the Soummam Conference where the FLN made arrangements for independence.

She continued to serve with Amirouche as both a nurse and an armed fighter until 27 June 1957 when she was shot dead by a French soldier while caring for the wounded in a cave in the mountains west of Bouïra. The French army had organized a huge attack on the region to overcome those fighting for independence. After she died, Amirouche wrote to her family, emphasizing that she had not only cared for the Mujahideen fighters and raised their morale but had become a true fighter herself.

A commemorative postage stamp was issued in her honour in 2019.
