= Chaâbane Aït Abderrahim =

Algerian politician (1939–2009)

10th wali of Algiers Province
- In office January 30, 1984 – May 7, 1986
- Preceded by: Ahmed El Ghazi
- Succeeded by: Cherif Rahmani

Wali of Constantine Province
- In office December 1, 1980 – January 30, 1984
- Preceded by: Djelloul Khatib
- Succeeded by: Hamid Sidi Said

Wali of M'Sila Province
- Succeeded by: Noureddine Sahraoui

Personal details
- Born: 1939 Sersou, Tiaret Province, French Algeria (now Algeria)
- Died: December 26, 2009 (aged 69–70) Sersou, Tiaret Province, Algeria
- Party: FLN

Chaâbane Aït Abderrahim (1939 – December 26, 2009) was an Algerian politician and veteran who served as the 10th wali of Algiers Province as well as the wali of M'Sila Province and Constantine Province and several other positions in the upper echelons of the Algerian government.

== Biography ==
Abderrahim was born in 1939 in the village of Sersou, Tiaret Province, French Algeria. He studied law at the University of Ben Aknoun, and later became a senior executive in various ministries in the Algerian government. In the 1970s, Abderrahim served as an executive in the Ministry of the Mujahideen, as Secretary-general of the National Economic and Social Council, and as an executive of the Ministry of Tourism. Abderrahim also helped standardize the Algerian Arabic dialect.

In the late 1970s, Abderrahim was appointed as wali of M'Sila Province, serving until November 30, 1980. He was then appointed as wali of Constantine Province, serving until January 30, 1984. From 1984 to 1986, Abderrahim served as wali of Algiers Province, reportedly reviving the aesthetics of the city during his time as wali.

Abderrahim died on December 26, 2009, in his hometown of Sersou. His successor as wali of Algiers, Cherif Rahmani, gave a eulogy for him in El Watan.
