= Asma Chaabi =

Moroccan politician

- Born: 1962 (age 63–64); Kenitra, Morocco
- Education: University of Westminster
- Occupation: Politician
- Known for: The first woman ever elected mayor in Morocco history
- Parent(s): Miloud Chaabi (father)
- Relatives: Mohcine Chaabi (brother); Mohamed Chaabi (brother); Omar Chaabi (brother); Faouzi Chaabi (brother)

Asma Chaabi (born 1962 in Kenitra, Morocco) is a Moroccan politician. A member of the Party of Progress and Socialism, she is the first woman ever elected mayor of an urban center in Morocco. She was mayor of the city of Essaouira from 2003 to 2009. When she stepped down, Mrs. Chaabi said she would leave politics. However, in 2016 she became a member of the national parliament. Morocco continues to have among the lowest female representation in politics in north Africa.

She is the daughter of businessman Miloud Chaabi, the president and founder of Ynna Holding, a diversified conglomerate centered on construction and infrastructure work. Asmaa Chaabi graduated from the University of Westminster in London in 1985. She is a politician, businesswoman, feminist, artist, and philanthropist.
