= United Nations Economic and Social Council =

Intergovernmental organization organ

History
- Founded: 26 June 1945; 81 years ago

Leadership
- President: (Algeria) Amar Bendjama

Structure
- Seats: African states (14) Asia-Pacific states (11) Eastern European states (6) Latin American and Caribbean states (10) Western European and other states (13)

Meeting place
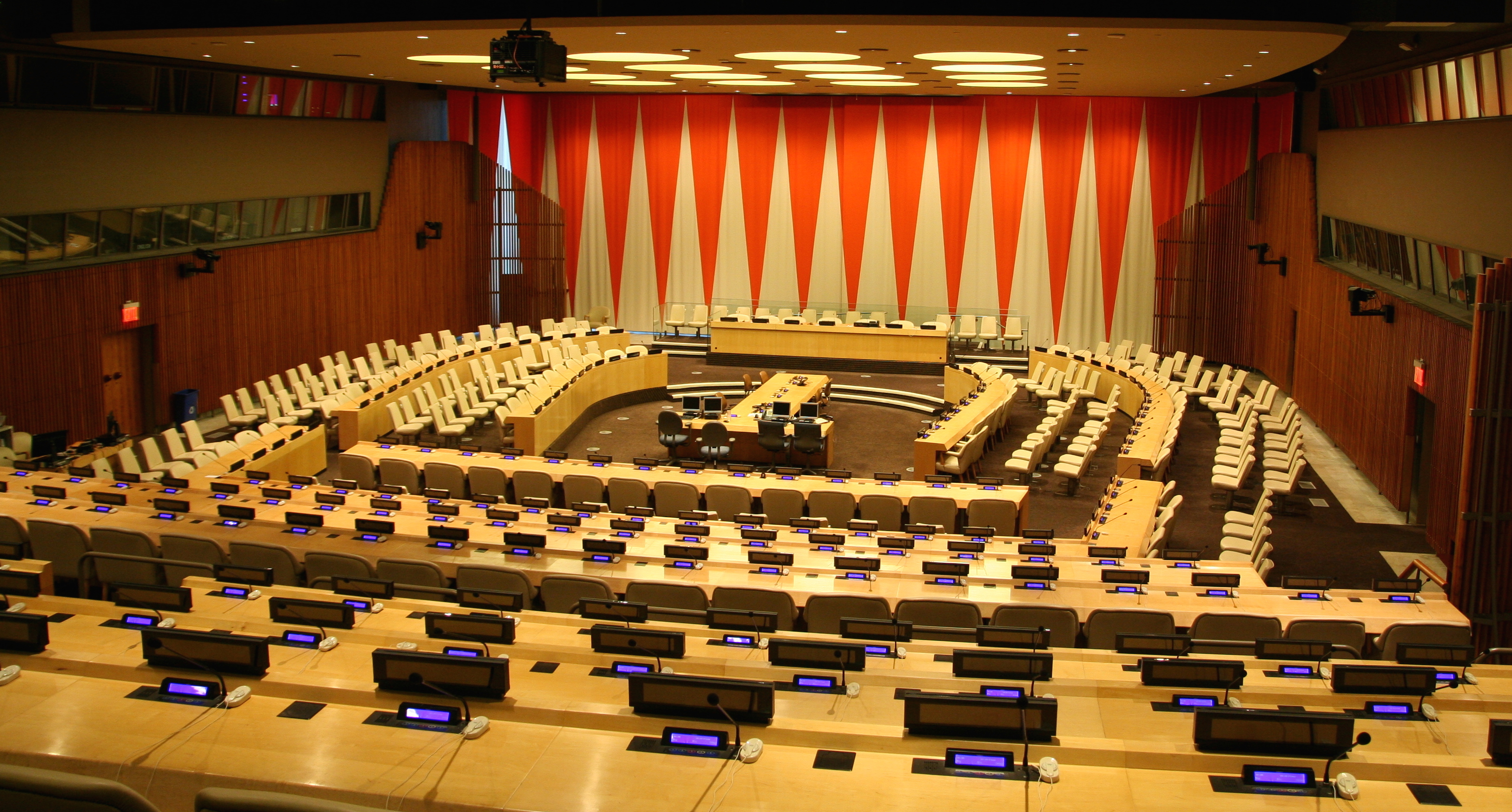
- United Nations Economic and Social Council chamber at United Nations headquarters

Website
- ecosoc.un.org/en

The United Nations Economic and Social Council (ECOSOC) is one of six principal organs of the United Nations (UN), responsible for coordinating the economic and social fields of the organization, specifically in regards to the fifteen specialized agencies, the eight functional commissions, and the five regional commissions under its jurisdiction.

ECOSOC serves as the central forum for discussing international economic and social issues, and formulating policy recommendations addressed to member states and the United Nations System. It has a rotating membership of 54 countries, and over 1,600 nongovernmental organizations have consultative status with the Council to participate in the work of the United Nations.

ECOSOC holds one four-week session each year in July, and since 1998 has also held an annual meeting in April with finance ministers of heading key committees of the World Bank and the International Monetary Fund (IMF). Additionally, the High-level Political Forum on Sustainable Development (HLPF), which reviews the implementation of the 2030 Agenda for Sustainable Development, is convened under the auspices of the Council every July.

The members of ECOSOC are responsible for electing the executive board of UNICEF, the council of the United Nations Development Programme, the committee of UNHCR, various commissions and other bodies under its jurisdiction, and one-half of the executive board of the World Food Programme. ECOSOC is also responsible for tasks such as reviewing and updating the UN list of least developed countries.

== President ==
The president of the Council is elected for a one-year term and chosen from the small or medium sized states represented on the Council at the beginning of each new session. The presidency rotates among the United Nations Regional Groups to ensure equal representation.

His Excellency Lok Bahadur Thapa was elected the President of the Economic and Social Council for the 2025-26 Session on 31 July 2025. His Excellency Bob Rae was elected the President of the Economic and Social Council for the 2024-25 Session on 25 July 2024. Paula Narváez, Representative of Chile, was elected as the seventy-ninth president of the Council on 27 July 2023. She succeeded Lachezara Stoeva, who was elected as the seventy-eighth president of the Council on 25 July 2022, succeeding Collen Vixen Kelapile of Botswana.

== Members ==
The Council consists of 54 Member States, which are elected yearly by the General Assembly for overlapping three-year terms. Seats on the Council are allocated ensuring equitable geographic rotation among the United Nations regional groups. Outgoing members are eligible for immediate re-election, and some seats are held by de facto permanent members.

=== History ===
In 1945 when the United Nations Charter was originally signed, the Economic and Social Council consisted of 18 seats. The formal concept of the United Nations Regional Groups did not yet exist, and unlike the Security Council, there was no "gentlemen's agreement" between the superpowers to assign ECOSOC seats. Regardless, with 4 exceptions out of 102 elections (see list), a relatively stable pattern emerged and held until 1960: (Note: For comparison purposes, applying the Regional Groups retroactively: 1 seat to the African Group; 3 seats to the Asian Group and Taiwan; 3 seats to the Eastern European Group; 4 seats to the Latin American and Caribbean Group; 7 seats to Western European and Others Group; (The Republic of China (Taiwan) never joined the Asian Group.))

- 5 seats to the Permanent Five of the UNSC
- 4 seats to Latin America
- 2 seats to Eastern Europe
- 1 seat to the British Commonwealth
- 3 seats to the "Near and Far East" (Note: Various nonstandard, inconsistent names, including also "Near and Middle East", were used before Africa and Asia became Regional Groups. Sources published after the introduction of the Regional Groups retroactively name this group "Asia-Africa" or similar, but this name was not used at the creation of ECOSOC.)
- 3 seats to Western Europe

As the number of United Nations members grew with decolonization, the pattern began to break down starting in 1961, with nations in Africa winning elections to seats formerly held by Western Europe and the Republic of China (Taiwan). (Note: For comparison purposes: 2 seats to the African Group; 3 seats to the Asian Group; 3 seats to the Eastern European Group; 4 seats to the Latin American and Caribbean Group; 6 seats to Western European and Others Group)

In 1965, the Charter was amended to increase the size of ECOSOC to 27 seats, and the Regional Groups were formally introduced. The seat distribution became:

- 5 seats to the Asian Group
- 3 seats to the Eastern European Group
- 5 seats to the Latin American and Caribbean Group
- 7 seats to the Western European and Others Group

In 1973, the Charter was amended again to increase the size of ECOSOC to 54 seats. The seat distribution became:

- 14 seats to the African Group
- 11 seats to the Asia-Pacific Group (renamed from the Asian Group in 2011)
- 6 seats to the Eastern European Group
- 10 seats to the Latin American and Caribbean Group
- 13 seats to the Western European and Others Group

=== Current members ===
Term	African States (14)	Asia-Pacific States (11)	Eastern European States (6)	Latin American & Caribbean States (10)	Western European & Other States (13)
2026–2028	Burundi; Chad; Mozambique; Sierra Leone	China; India; Lebanon; Turkmenistan	Croatia; Russia; Ukraine	Ecuador; Peru; Saint Kitts and Nevis	Australia; Finland; Norway; Turkey
2025–2027	Algeria; Djibouti; Ivory Coast; South Africa; Tanzania	Bangladesh; Saudi Arabia; Sri Lanka; Uzbekistan	Armenia; Azerbaijan	Antigua and Barbuda; Dominican Republic; Mexico	Canada; Italy (2025); Netherlands; Switzerland; United States (2026–2027)
2024–2026	Kenya; Mauritania; Nigeria; Senegal; Zambia	Japan; Nepal; Pakistan	Poland	Haiti; Paraguay; Suriname; Uruguay	Austria; France; Germany (2026); Liechtenstein (2024–2025); Spain; United Kingdom

=== Observer Inter-Governmental Autonomous Organisations ===
Participation on a continuing basis:

- African Regional Centre of Technology
- Asian and Pacific Development Centre
- Asian Productivity Organisation
- Council of Arab Economic Unity
- Global Water Partnership
- Helsinki Commission
- Inter-American Institute for Cooperation on Agriculture
- Intergovernmental Forum on Mining, Minerals, Metals and Sustainable Development
- Intergovernmental Institution For the Use of Micro-Algae Spirulina Against Malnutrition
- International Association of Economic and Social Councils and Similar Institutions
- International Center for Public Enterprises in Developing Countries
- International Centre for Genetic Engineering and Biotechnology
- Islamic Educational, Scientific and Cultural Organization
- Latin American Energy Organization
- Organization of Ibero-American States
- Organization of the Petroleum Exporting Countries
- Regional Organisation for the Protection of the Marine Environment
- Union des Conseils Économiques et Sociaux Africains
- West African Economic and Monetary Union
- World Deserts Foundation
- Wikimedia Foundation

Participation on an ad hoc basis:

- African Accounting Council
- African Cultural Institute
- Arab Security Studies and Training Center
- Council of Arab Ministers of the Interior
- International Bauxite Association
- International Civil Defence Organisation
- Latin American Social Sciences Institute

== Commissions ==
=== Functional commissions ===
==== Active ====
The following are the active functional commission of the Council:

- Commission on Narcotic Drugs (CND)
- Commission on Population and Development (CPD)
- Commission on Science and Technology for Development (CSTD)
- Commission on the Status of Women (CSW)
- Statistical Commission (StatCom)
- Commission for Social Development (CSocD)
- Commission on Crime Prevention and Criminal Justice (CCPCJ)
- Forum on Forests (UNFF)

==== Disbanded ====
The following commissions were disbanded by the Council and replaced by other bodies:

- Commission on Human Rights (UNCHR)
  - Disbanded in 2006 and replaced by the United Nations Human Rights Council (UNHRC), a subsidiary organ of the General Assembly.
- Commission on Sustainable Development (CSD)
  - Disbanded in 2013 and replaced by the High-level Political Forum on Sustainable Development (HLPF), a joint subsidiary body of the General Assembly and ECOSOC.

=== Regional commissions ===
The following are the active regional commissions of the Council:

- Europe: United Nations Economic Commission for Europe (ECE)
- Africa: United Nations Economic Commission for Africa (ECA)
- Latin America and the Caribbean: United Nations Economic Commission for Latin America and the Caribbean (ECLAC)
- Asia and the Pacific: United Nations Economic and Social Commission for Asia and the Pacific (ESCAP)
- Western Asia: United Nations Economic and Social Commission for Western Asia (ESCWA)

The key goal of the regional commissions is to "raise the [regional] level of economic activity"; none of the regional commissions has in its founding mandate a reference to sustainability or to the environmental dimension of development.

All UN regional commissions have expanded their activities to work toward achieving the Sustainable Development Goals (SDGs). They increasingly include a concern for the environmental and social dimensions of development, along with their traditional economic focus. They have set standards for SDG implementation by providing (financial) support through reporting guidelines, performance indicators, and other managerial tools. However, their limited resources force them to prioritize; diverse sets of priorities in the region only partially overlap with the SDGs.

The regional commissions seek to link the global ambitions of the SDGs with regional actors, contexts, and priorities. In practice, however, when it comes to agenda setting, the regional commissions mostly seek to balance the new global agenda with their regional priorities and prior agendas.

== Committees and other bodies ==
The following are some of the other bodies that the Council oversees in some capacity:

=== Standing committees ===
- Committee for Programme and Coordination (CPC)
- Committee on Non-Governmental Organizations
- Committee on Negotiations with Intergovernmental Agencies

=== Expert bodies ===
- Committee for Development Policy (CDP)
- Committee on Economic, Social and Cultural Rights (CESCR)
- Committee of Experts on Global Geospatial Information Management (UN-GGIM)
- Committee of Experts on International Cooperation in Tax Matters
- Committee of Experts on Public Administration (CEPA)
- Committee of Experts on the Transport of Dangerous Goods and the Globally Harmonized System of Classification and Labelling of Chemicals
- Group of Experts on Geographical Names (UNGEGN)
- Intergovernmental Working Group of Experts on International Standards of Accounting and Reporting
- Permanent Forum on Indigenous Issues (UNPFII)

=== Other subsidiary bodies ===
- System Chief Executives Board for Coordination (CEB)
- High-Level Committee on Management (HLCM)
- High-Level Committee on Programmes (HLCP)

== Specialized agencies ==
The specialized agencies of the United Nations are autonomous organizations working within the United Nations System, meaning that while they report their activities to the Economic and Social Council, they are mostly free to their own devices. Some were created before the United Nations existed and were integrated into the system, others were created by the League of Nations and were integrated by its successor, while others were created by the United Nations itself to meet emerging needs. Each agency must negotiate with the Council as to what their relationship will look and work like. This leads to a system where different organizations maintain different types of relationships with the Council. For example, in the 1950s the members of ECOSOC were responsible for granting a state admission to UNESCO, but now this is done by the members of UNESCO themselves.

The following is a list of the specialized agencies reporting to the Council:

- Food and Agriculture Organization (FAO)
- International Civil Aviation Organization (ICAO)
- International Fund for Agricultural Development (IFAD)
- International Labour Organization (ILO)
- International Monetary Fund (IMF)
- International Maritime Organization (IMO)
- International Telecommunication Union (ITU)
- United Nations Educational, Scientific and Cultural Organization (UNESCO)
- United Nations Industrial Development Organization (UNIDO)
- United Nations World Tourism Organization (UNWTO)
- Universal Postal Union (UPU)
- World Bank Group (WBG)
  - International Bank for Reconstruction and Development (IBRD)
  - International Development Association (IDA)
  - International Finance Corporation (IFC)
  - Multilateral Investment Guarantee Agency (MIGA)
  - International Centre for Settlement of Investment Disputes (ICSID)
- World Health Organization (WHO)
- World Intellectual Property Organization (WIPO)
- World Meteorological Organization (WMO)

== World Economic & Social Survey 2011: Great Green Technological Transform ==
In a report issued in early July 2011, the UN called for spending nearly US$2 trillion on green technologies to prevent what it termed "a major planetary catastrophe", warning that "It is rapidly expanding energy use, mainly driven by fossil fuels, that explains why humanity is on the verge of breaching planetary sustainability boundaries through global warming, biodiversity loss, and disturbance of the nitrogen-cycle balance and other measures of the sustainability of the earth's ecosystem".

UN Secretary-General Ban Ki-moon added: "Rather than viewing growth and sustainability as competing goals on a collision course, we must see them as complementary and mutually supportive imperatives". The report concluded that "Business as usual is not an option".

== Reforms ==
The governance of the multilateral system has historically been complex and fragmented. This has limited the capacity of ECOSOC to influence international policies in trade, finance, and investment. Reform proposals aim to enhance the relevance and contribution of the council. A major reform was approved by the 2005 World Summit based on proposals submitted by secretary-general Kofi Annan. The Summit aimed to establish ECOSOC as a quality platform for high-level engagement among member states and with international financial institutions, the private sector, and civil society on global trends, policies, and action. It resolved to hold biennial high-level Development Cooperation Forums at the national-leadership level, transforming the high-level segment of the Council to review trends in international development cooperation and promote greater coherence in development activities. At the Summit it was also decided to hold annual ministerial-level substantive reviews to assess progress in achieving internationally agreed on development goals (particularly the Millennium Development Goals). These "Annual Ministerial Reviews" will be replaced by the High-Level Political Forum from 2016 onwards after the new post-MDG/post-2015 Sustainable Development Goals are agreed upon.

Subsequent proposals by the High-Level Panel Report on System-Wide Coherence in November 2006 aimed to establish a forum within the ECOSOC as a counter-model to the exclusive clubs of the G8 and G20. The Forum was to comprise 27 heads of state (L27, corresponding to half of ECOSOC's membership) to meet annually and provide international leadership in the development area. This proposal however, was not approved by the General Assembly.

== Society and culture ==
=== Chamber design ===
The Economic and Social Council Chamber in the United Nations Conference Building was a gift from Sweden. It was conceived by Swedish architect Sven Markelius, one of the 11 architects in the international team that designed the UN headquarters. Wood from Swedish pine trees was used in the delegates' area for the railings and doors. The pipes and ducts in the ceiling above the public gallery were deliberately left exposed; the architect believed that anything useful could be left uncovered. The "unfinished" ceiling is a symbolic reminder that the economic and social work of the United Nations is never finished; there will always be something more that can be done to improve living conditions for the world's people.

== See also ==
- Copenhagen Consensus
- French Economic and Social Council
- European Economic and Social Committee (EU)
- International Court of Justice
- UN Trusteeship Council
- UN Department of Economic and Social Affairs
- Union of International Associations
- Chapter X of the United Nations Charter
