= Slimane Bengui =

Algerian writer and businessman

Slimane Bengui was an Algerian writer and businessman. He was the director of the first French-language Algerian newspaper "El Hack". Moreover, he was also a tobacco manufacturer.

== "El Hack" newspaper ==
In 1893 Slimane Bengui, alongside Omar Samar and Khelil Kaid Laioun, launched the "El Hack" newspaper in Bône (Annaba). The newspaper was the first publication available to the wider public in Algeria. Predominantly written in French, the weekly newspaper also included some publications in the Arabic language.

Bengui's father, Hadj Omar, was the primary financial backer of the newspaper. As director, Bengui and his peers engaged in a cultural and political struggle to defend the values of the colonized Muslim population. Consequently, the French administration banned the "El Hack" newspaper in 1894.

== Personal life ==
Bengui's father was El Haj Omar Bengui, who owned the "Dar Bengui" palace in Annaba. His mother was the daughter of Mostefa Ben Karim who was from the Bey Kara Ali family - a notable family of Turkish origin.
