= Lakhdar Ben Cherif =

Algerian poet

- Born: 1899; El-Oued, French Algeria
- Died: 1967 (aged 67–68); Bouzaréah, Algeria

Lakhdar Ben Cherif (1899–1967) was a popular Algerian poet. Many of his poems were later released as popular songs, including by the Algerian singer Abdallah Menai. Ben Cherif's mother was of Turkish origin.
