= Djelloul Benkalfate =

Algerian educator, writer and musician

Djelloul Benkalfate, also spelt as Djelloul Benkalfat, (1903–1989) was an Algerian educator, socialist, writer, and musician. He was an active member in many organisations working for human rights, democracy and justice. Moreover, he participated in the creation of the "Universite Populaire de Tlemcen" (People's University of Tlemcen), of which he was director from 1952 to 1962.

== Early life and career ==
Benkalfate was born in 1903 in Tlemcen into a family of Turkish origin. After completing his primary education, he studied at the Ecole Normale de Bouzarea and graduated in 1924. Thereafter, from the 1930s onwards, he began teaching in Ghazaouet and then in Tlemcen. He also made many trips to Paris, Rome, Istanbul, and elsewhere to discuss and exchange knowledge on pedagogy and socialism.

As a militant trade unionist, he was considered "a great defender of the people", and established the "Universite Populaire de Tlemcen" (People's University of Tlemcen) with the help of the socialist municipality of Tlemcen and the lawyer Raymond Blanc. Consequently, this initiative allowed many citizens who were excluded from the school system or unable to continue their studies to obtain their Baccalauréat. Benkalfate was the director of the university from 1952 to 1962.

== Music ==
After retiring from teaching, Benkalfate turned his attention to his passion for Andalusian classical music. In 1964 he created a music association called "Gharnata" with Sid Ahmed Triqui, Ahmed Benosmane, Mustapha Belkhodja and several other music lovers. Between 1964-89, they formed a band, gave conferences, taught courses, and organised evening events. The association worked to discover and promote the Tlemcenian cultural heritage of Andalusian music.

== Awards ==
Benkalfate earned the "Chevalier de la légion d´honneur" signed by the President Vincent Auriol.

== Publications ==
In 2002 Benkalfate's children, Dr. Fouad Benkalfate and Sabiha Benkalfate-Benmansour, published his book "Il était une fois Tlemcen... récit d'une vie, récit d'une ville" ("Once upon a time Tlemcen ... a story of a life, an account of a city") which describes the history and geography of Tlemcen.
