= Hadj Menouar =

Algerian singer

- Birth name: Menouar Kerar
- Also known as: Prince of tar
- Born: 1913; Algiers, Algeria
- Origin: Bordj Menaïel
- Died: November 7, 1971; El Madania, Algeria
- Genres: Chaabi
- Occupation(s): Composer, singer, conductor
- Instruments: tar

Hadj Menouar (1913 – November 4, 1971) was an Algerian singer.

== Biography ==
Born in the Casbah of Algiers, he came from a modest family native of Ain Assila (Bordj Menaïel). Hadj Menouar, whose real name was Menouar Kerar, had to get to work early to support his family. Deprived of instruction, he couldn't read or write, but he was endowed by a phenomenal memory. Storing hundreds of Qasidas even the longest, he quickly became a veritable encyclopedia. He became interested in music at a very young age and was encouraged by Mohamed K'hioudji, Hadj M'rizek half-brother. He learned everything that he heard from the masters of his time such as Mustapha Driouech, Kouider Ben Smail, EI-Ounnas Khmissa, Said Laaouar, Cheikh Saidi and more. Two qualities were absolutely necessary for singers to succeed; unfailing memory and a powerful voice. As it was frowned on seeing singers presenting themselves to the public reading their texts. Microphones did not exist, it was the voice that had to be heard and imposed to the public. All these qualities were controlled by Hadj Menouar. The singer was accompanied at the time by percussion instruments like daf, bendir and tar. Instruments such as violin, mandolin, and qanun where later introduced in mdih by Cheikh Ben Kouider.

Hadj Menouar conserved the old tradition of using tar to accompany himself. He was the undisputed master of this instrument to the point that he has been dubbed "the Prince of Tar" by Ahmed Lakchal who introduced him at the radio. Especially concerned with the Med'h and long specializing in the neutral religious of the genre his fame extended day by day. He led many family or public festivals, receiving a warm welcome from the people who loved his loud and melodious voice. Mahieddine Bachtarzi would engage him in the concert part of his theatrical tours and make him known in all parts of the territory. He has recorded a dozen records in the 50s on the Pathé-Marconi label with a ditty entitled Khemous alik oue serre aliya, with lyrics written by El-Anka. Nervous, alert but generous and helpful, he was available to answer all sorts of questions put to him by the young people who started in music. He was employed for many years as an officer on duty at the former RTA, without taking advantage of his artistic abilities. He had the distinction of playing the tar while singing. He played other instruments, but never exhibited it. El Hadj Menouar participated alongside El Hadj M'Hamed El Anka and Hadj M'rizek, a show organized to benefit the family of Cheikh Khelifa Belkacem, who had just died on November 4, 1951. The gala took place on March 20, 1952, in Ibn Khaldun club (ex-pierre Bordes), the entertainment was provided by Othmane Boujuetaïa. He had to perform two songs that evening: Ya Tbib aref daya and A lalla el batoul

He loved to perform during the month of Ramadhan in cafes and had a preference for Café Djamaâ Fares (formerly Djamaâ Lihoud) and that of Touadjine in the neighborhood of Tijditt in Mostaganem.

== Death ==
He died on November 7, 1971, in El Madania (Algiers).
