= Mustapha Khedali =

Algerian footballer and manager (1934-2008)

Mustapha "Mus" Khedali (born 19 April 1934 in Alger, Algeria; died 13 August 2008) was an Algerian football player and manager. He spent his entire playing career with FC Gueugnon and went on to briefly manage US Marcigny after his playing career before returning to FC Gueugnon as a club official. He played most of his career as a forward before converting to a central back in his final years.

Khedali died on 13 August 2008 and a moment of silence was observed in his honor in a league game between FC Gueugnon and Croix De Savoie.

== Career ==
- 1955-1969 FC Gueugnon (France)

== See also ==
- Football in Algeria
- List of football clubs in Algeria
