= Cherif Rahmani =

Algerian politician

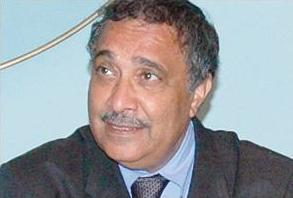
Cherif Rahmani

Cherif Rahmani was the Algerian minister for supply in the 1995 government of Mokdad Sifi. He was the Minister of Tourism around 2002 and created the World Deserts Foundation.
