= Mustapha Toumi =

- Born: July 14, 1937; Algiers, Algeria
- Died: April 3, 2013; Algiers, Algeria
- Genres: Chaabi
- Occupations: Composer, musician, painter (Arabic, French)

Mustapha Toumi (July 14, 1937 – April 3, 2013) was an Algerian songwriter, lyricist, composer, poet and painter.

== Biography ==
Coming from a family of Bordj Menaïel, he was born on July 14, 1937, in the Casbah of Algiers.

Long before the outbreak of the Algerian War, Mustapha Sahnoune created at the end of the 40s, an ensemble with his friends, he called, La Rose blanche.

In 1958, the political leadership of the revolution based in Tunis decides to create two artistic and athletic troops that will be the spokesman of a people fighting for its liberation. A great appeal is launched, following this decision, from Radio Tunis, "Sawt El Djazaïr" for all Algerians who are in the country or abroad to join the FLN in Tunis.

This band presents songs of different themes, much more popular, until 1954 when all cultural activity is prohibited. Just after the strike of eight days of January 28, 1957, these artists which were forbidden to perform in their country regain Tunisia, and others among them, joined the maquis. Among the members of the troupe are Mustapha Sahnoun, Mustapha Kateb, Boualem Raïs, Sid Ali Kouiret

He was active in the ranks of the FLN and participated in 1958 for "La voix de l'Algérie libre et combattante" (clandestine radio). After 1962, he was responsible for Cultural Affairs, Ministry of Information and party leader of the FLN, while working at several newspapers and magazines. Mustapha Toumi is the initiator of several major international cultural events held in Algeria. In 1990, he created the National Alliance of Independent Democrats (Andi), a political party that would not last long.

He died on April 3, 2013, at the Mustapha-Pacha hospital in Algiers. He is buried at the El Kettar Cemetery.

== Compositions ==
- Sbhan Allah ya Ltif played by El Hadj El Anka
- Africa sung by the South African Miriam Makeba.
- Lyrics to Kalbi ya Bladi la nensek a patriotic song Mustapha Sahnoune composed, performed by El Hadi Radjeb at the age of 13
- Lyrics to Che Guevara for Mohamed Lamari
- Lyrics to Ya dellal for Nadia Kerbache
- Lyrics to Ki lioum ki zmane for Zerouali
