= Abdul Baqi Miftah =

Algerian Islamic scholar (born 1952)

Sufi Scholar Abdul Baqi Miftah

Personal life
- Born: 1952 (age 73–74)
- Region: Algeria
- Main interest(s): Ibn al-Arabi, Sufism

Religious life
- Religion: Islam
- Denomination: Sunni
- Jurisprudence: Maliki

Muslim leader
- Influenced by: Mohamed Belkaid al-Habry

Sheikh Abdul Bāqi Miftāh (Arabic: الشيخ عبد الباقي مفتاح) is a Sunni Islamic scholar of Sufism from Guemar, Algeria. He is known for his writings on Ibn al-Arabi.

== Life and education ==
He graduated from college in 1975 and did national service for two years. Then he joined the Education Corps as a teacher of math and science until he retired. He used to isolate himself away from the city out in the sand dunes in serenity, busying himself with dhikr, contemplation, reciting the Qur'an, and writing. Dr. Abdellilah Benarafa, an expert at ISESCO, said he knew him since the 1990s when he was taking classes on Ibn 'Arabi at Paris-Sorbonne University, stating "I am not exaggerating at all by saying that Abdul Baqi Miftah is one of the greatest specialists in the works of ibn al-Arabi."

He took a path of Sufism in 1973 under Mohamed Belkaid al-Habry, sheikh of the Habriyya, Darqawiyya, and Shadiliyya tariqa. His sheikh advised him to open a zawiya in Guemar, which was completed in 1988 after it was constructed by a group of murids.

== Works ==
Sheikh Abdul Baqi Miftah has written at least 47 books.

=== Works on Ibn 'Arabi ===
1. المفاتيح الوجودية والقرآنية لفصوص الحكم لابن العربي، طبعة أولى عام 1417هـ/1997م بدار القبة الزرقاء للنشر، مراكش (بعنوان: مفاتيح فصوص الحكم). وطبعة ثانية بدار البراق، بيروت وفرنسا 1425هـ/2004م. وطبعة ثالثة بدار الكتب العلمية ببيروت عام 2010م.
2. ختم القرآن محيى الدين ابن العربي( سيرته)، دار القبة الزرقاء، مراكش 2005. و دار الكتب العلمية ببيروت عام 2009م.
3. بحوث حول كتب ومفاهيم ابن العربي، دار الكتب العلمية، بيروت 2010.
4. الردّ على محمود الغراب في تشريحه لفصوص ابن العربي، تحت الطبع في دار عالم الكتب الحديث، الأردن.
5. الشرح القرآني لكتاب "مشاهد الأسرار القدسية" لابن العربي، دار الكتب العلمية، بيروت 2009.
6. شروح على تفاسير فاتحة الكتاب والبسملة عند ابن العربي، المكتبة الفلسفية الصوفية، الجزائر، 1435هـ/2014م.
7. حقائق القرآن عند ابن العربي، تحت الطبع في دار عالم الكتب الحديث، الأردن.
8. الحقائق الوجودية الكبرى عند ابن العربي، نينوى للتحقيق والنشر، دمشق 2013.
9. الشرح القرآني لكتاب "التجليات" لابن العربي، تحت الطبع في دار عالم الكتب الحديث، الأردن.
10. شرح كتاب "عنقاء مغرب" لابن العربي،، تحت الطبع في دار عالم الكتب الحديث، الأردن.
11. الكمالات المحمّدية والإنسان الكامل عند ابن العربي. ، تحت الطبع في دار عالم الكتب الحديث، الأردن.
12. تحقيق وشروح على كتاب "إشارات القرآن في عالم الإنسان" لابن العربي. تحت الطبع في دار نينوى للتحقيق والنشر، دمشق.
13. تحقيق وتعليق على كتاب "لواقح الأنوار من كلام الشيخ الأكبر" لابن سودكين. تحت الطبع في دار نينوى للتحقيق والنشر، دمشق
14. كتاب في أجزاء بصدد الكتابة ونسأل الله – تعالى- التوفيق لإتمامه عنوانه:" شروح على التفسير الإشاري للقرآن الكريم" لابن العربي. يشمل كل السور إن شاء الله تعالى.

=== Other works ===
1. كتاب اسم الجلالة الأعظم، دار الكتب العلمية، بيروت 2006.
2. أضواء على الشيخ عبد القادر الجيلاني وانتشار طريقته، دار الهدى، عين مليلة-الجزائر، 1429هـ/2008م.
3. أضواء على الشيخ أحمد التجاني وطريقته وأتباعه، دار الكتب العلمية، بيروت 2008 و2009.
4. أضواء على الطريقة الرّحمانية الخلوتية، دار الكتب العلمية، بيروت 2009.
5. تحقيق وتقديم كتاب "المواقف" للأمير عبد القادر الجزائري، في ثلاثة أجزاء، دار الهدى، عين مليلة-الجزائر، 2007م.
6. الكوكب الدرّي في شرح الصلاة على النبيّ الأمّي، لم يـنشر.
7. طريق الله.. وبحوث وشروح على أبواب الفتوحات المكية لابن العربي، لم ينشر.
8. Clefs pour comprendre l'oeuvre d'Ibn Arabi, Editions i, avril 2024 (ISBN 978-2-37650-136-7)

=== Works translated from French into Arabic ===
1. هيمنة الكم وعلامات أخر الزمان، دار عالم الكتب الحديث، الأردن، 2013.
2. رموز العلم المقدس، دار عالم الكتب الحديث، الأردن، 2014.
3. نظرات في التربية الروحية، دار عالم الكتب الحديث، الأردن، 2014.
4. التربية و التحقق الروحي: تصحيح المفاهيم، دار عالم الكتب الحديث، الأردن، 2014.
5. التصوّف الإسلامي المقارَن، دار عالم الكتب الحديث، الأردن، 2013.
6. مليك العالم، دار عالم الكتب الحديث، الأردن، 2013.
7. مراتب الوجود المتعددة، تحت الطبع في دار عالم الكتب الحديث، الأردن.
8. رموز الإنسان الكامل( رمزية تقاطع خط الإسراء الأفقي وخط المعراج العمودي) ، تحت الطبع في دار عالم الكتب الحديث، الأردن.
9. شرق وغرب. ، تحت الطبع فيدار عالم الكتب الحديث، الأردن.
