= Maamar Bettayeb =

Algerian systems scientist (born 1953)

- Born: June 7, 1953 (age 73); Beni Amrane, Boumerdès Province, Algeria
- Scientific career
- Fields: Automatic control; Signal processing; Model order reduction; Control theory; Optimal control; System analysis; Mathematical optimization
- Workplaces: Shell Oil Company; King Fahd University of Petroleum and Minerals; University of Sharjah; University of Malaya; Helsinki University of Technology; King Abdulaziz University; University of Southern California
- Thesis: Approximation of Linear Systems: New Approaches Based on Singular Value Decomposition (1981)
- Doctoral advisor: Professor Leonard M. Silverman

Maamar Bettayeb (born 7 June 1953) is an Algerian control theorist, educator and inventor. He is the author of publications on understanding the singular value decomposition and model order reduction. Bettayeb is also a promoter of scientific research.

== Early years ==
Bettayeb continued his elementary and middle studies in Beni Amrane before joining the polyvalent high school of Tizi Ouzou in 1969 to follow his secondary studies in the Mathematics sector. After obtaining his baccalaureate in 1972 with a first class honors, he obtained a scholarship from the Algerian state to continue his university studies in the United States at the University of Southern California in Los Angeles.

He obtained his bachelor's degree in automatic control in 1976, then his master's degree in 1978.

Bettayeb obtained his PhD degree in 1981 following his defense of his thesis at the University of Southern California in the Department of Electrical Engineering, and whose title was "Approximation of Linear Systems: New Approaches Based on Singular Value Decomposition", under the supervision of Professor Emeritus Leonard M. Silverman.

== Career ==
He worked as a research scientist for a year in Houston, Texas until 1982 in the Bellaire Research Center at Shell Oil Development Company, in the development of seismic signal processing deconvolution algorithms for the purpose of Gas and Oil exploration. Back in Algeria, he was recruited by the Center for Development of Advanced Technologies (CDTA) where he headed the instrumentation and control department from 1982 until 1988, and he led various research and development projects in the field of modeling, simulation, and control design of large scale energy systems with applications to nuclear, solar, wind and electric power systems.

He then emigrated to Saudi Arabia where he joined King Fahd University of Petroleum and Minerals in Dhahran where he worked for two years until 1990.

During the year 2000 he joined the staff of the University of Sharjah as a professor, where he held research and administrative positions.

Since September 2014, Bettayeb has been vice-rector at this university where he is in charge of graduation and research. He is also associate professor in automatic control and signal processing within the Center of Excellence in Intelligent Engineering Systems (CEIES) at King Abdulaziz University in a research laboratory.

During his career, he published more than 350 scientific journal and conference papers.

Bettayeb was an External Examiner for Electrical Engineering Programs at the University of Malaya in Malaysia from 2001 to 2004.

He also participated as a visiting professor at the Helsinki University of Technology in Finland during the years 2001 to 2003, where he gave short courses, research seminars, workshops and participated in the examination of doctoral students.

Bettayeb has worked in scientific consulting for the petrochemical industries on behalf of several companies, and has also taken part in several R&D funded projects in the fields of control and signal processing applications.

He chaired the International Symposium on Signal Processing and its applications (ISSPA) 2007 conference organized by University of Jijel, and was also the chair/co-chair of the program committee of several conferences.

He was Deputy Editor-in-Chief of the International Journal of Modeling, Identification and Control, is currently the Head of the Intelligent Systems Research Group at the University of Sharjah where he also led the strategic planning development of the research.

== Research interests ==
Bettayeb has been interested in recent years in research areas related to:

- H-infinity methods in control theory
- Rational approximation
- Signal processing
- Image processing
- Process control
- Networked control systems
- Fractional-order systems
- Fractional-order control
- Estimation theory
- Nonlinear regression
- Filtering problem and nonlinear filters
- Soft computing
- Wavelets
- Renewable energy
- Engineering education

== Awards ==
Professor Bettayeb has received several awards and honors during his career in recognition of his work, including:

- Prize for the best research distinguished in 1993-94 and 1998–99 at King Fahd University of Petroleum and Minerals (KFUPM).
- Outstanding adviser award in 1996–97 at KFUPM.
- Award for the best researcher at the University of Sharjah (UoS) in 2001–2002, 2006–2007, 2007–2008 and 2010–2011.
- Sharjah Islamic Bank's Best Research Paper Award in 2003–2004.
- Prize for the best research project in 2006–2007 at UoS.
- Supervisor of the award for best student article, supervisor of the award for best student project in 2006–2007 at UOS.
- Director of the prize for the best master's thesis in 2009–2010 at UoS.
- Award for the best teaching at the University of Sharjah in 2011–2012.
- IEOM Distinguished Leadership Award in 2020.

== See also ==
- List of Algerians
- List of people in systems and control
- List of systems scientists
- University of Southern California
- King Fahd University of Petroleum and Minerals
- University of Sharjah
- University of Malaya
- Helsinki University of Technology
- King Abdulaziz University

== Bibliography ==
- American Doctoral Dissertations. University Microfilms. 1981. p. 201;419.
- S. G. Tzafestas (1985). Applied Digital Control. North-Holland. p. 220;223. ISBN 9780444878823.
- Richard J. Vaccaro (1991). SVD and Signal Processing, II: Algorithms, Analysis, and Applications. Elsevier. p. 454. ISBN 9780444888969.
- American Automatic Control Council (1993). Proceedings of the 1993 American Control Conference: The Westin St. Francis Hotel, San Francisco, California, June 2-4, 1993, Volume 2. The Council. pp. 2141–2142, 2146. ISBN 9780780308602.
- C. T. Leonides (2012). Control and Dynamic Systems V56: Digital and Numeric Techniques and Their Application in Control Systems: Advances in Theory and Applications, Partie 2. Academic Press. p. 564. ISBN 9780323163279.
- Adhemar Bultheel, Patrick Dewilde (2013). Rational Approximation in Systems Engineering. Springer Science & Business Media. p. 469. ISBN 9781489967909.

== Videos ==
- Bettayeb Webinaire Automatic Control: State of the Art and Future Directions - 26 December 2020 on YouTube
- Bettayeb conference: Course 1–4 August 2017 on YouTube
- Bettayeb conference: Course 2–4 August 2017 on YouTube
- Bettayeb conference: Course 3–4 August 2017 on YouTube
- Bettayeb conference: Debate around the course - 4 August 2017 on YouTube
