= Hsissen =

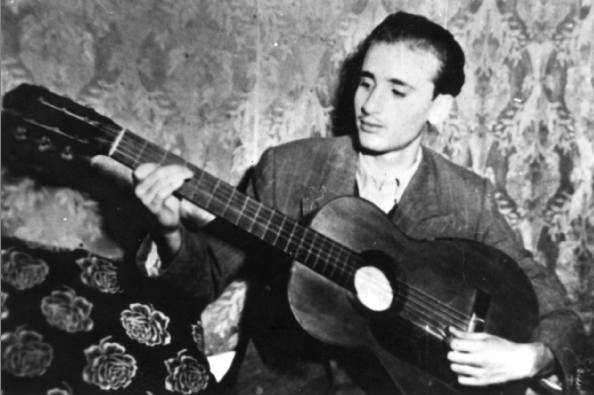

Background information
- Also known as: Cheikh Hcicène, Hsissene, Hcicene
- Born: Ahcène Larbi Benameur; December 8, 1929; Algiers, Algeria
- Died: September 29, 1958 (aged 28) Tunis, Tunisia
- Genres: Chaabi
- Occupations: Composer, singer
- Instruments: Mandole
- Years active: 1939–1958

Hsissen (December 8, 1929 – September 29, 1958) was an Algerian singer.

== Biography ==
Hsissen was born at 15 rue Monthabor in the Casbah of Algiers to a modest family, originally from Maâtkas (Tizi Ouzou Province). From a very young age, he was interested in the chanson style and the works of composer El Hadj M'Hamed El Anka. He also respected and admired the work of Khelifa Belkacem. At the age of 23, he formed an orchestra. Hsissen combined his love of music with activism with the Movement for the Triumph of Democratic Liberties and the National Liberation Front.

Hsissen died in Tunis on September 29, 1958, after a long bout of lung disease. His remains were re-interred in his homeland on September 29, 2012, in the commemoration of the 54th year of his death. This coincided with the fiftieth anniversary of the independence of Algeria. He is buried at the El Kettar Cemetery.

== Bibliography ==
- Les grandes figures de l'art musical Algérien, Tome 1, Edt : ENAG, Alger, 2008; by Abdelkader Bendameche.
