= Abdessami' Abdelhaï =

Algerian journalist

- Occupation: Journalist
- Organization: Jaridati

Abdessami' Abdelhaï is an Algerian journalist who was held without trial from 18 August 2013 to 21 September 2015, when he was released on provisional liberty pending trial. He was sentenced to three years' imprisonment in 2020.

== Career ==
At the time of his arrest, Abdelhaï worked for a regional radio station in Tébessa, 600 km east of Algiers, and was the local correspondent of the Arabic-language daily Jaridati.

== Arrest ==
He was arrested on 18 August 2013 for allegedly helping Jaridati editor Hicham Aboud to flee the country to escape prosecution. Aboud had been charged with "endangering national security, territorial integrity and the proper functioning of national institutions" because he talked with the international media about President Bouteflika's health.

After fleeing the country, Aboud was additionally charged with leaving the country illegally. In May 2013, in response to Aboud's actions, Algerian officials seized the latest issues of Jaridati and another newspaper edited by Aboud, Monjournal, which is published in French. Four months later, both publications were closed. Aboud maintained that he had left Algeria legally on 10 August 2013.

== Detention ==
After being held for five days in several different police units, where he was mistreated, Abdelhaï was thereafter held without trial in Tébessa.

Since 15 May 2014, Abdelhai has been awaiting a decision by the Algerian Supreme Court as to whether he should be tried by a magistrate or a criminal court.

On 5 November 2014, after his lawyer's fourth request for a provisional release was rejected, he began a hunger strike to protest his detention without trial.

He was released on provisional liberty pending trial on 21 September 2015.

== Criticism ==
Reporters Without Borders (RSF) criticized Abdelhaï's detention, stating "By holding this journalist for 15 months without trial, the Algerian authorities have violated his fundamental rights, above all, his right to freedom and a fair trial," RSF programme director Lucie Morillon said in November 2013. "We urge them to put him on trial now, so that he can defend himself, or otherwise free him at once."

Aboud acknowledged that he had met with Abdelhaï before leaving the country, but he said that this did not justify arresting Abdelhai. Aboud charged that the authorities had arrested Abdelhai for political reasons, especially with an eye to incriminating Aboud.

Several hundred people have signed a petition calling for Abdelhaï's release.

On 24 December 2014, when journalists and others had planned to hold a public demonstration protesting the continued detention of Abdelhaï, the police blocked the entrance to the Press House Tahar Djaout to prevent the demonstration. Instead of holding the public rally, the protesters held a sit-in inside the press house.

== Imprisonment ==
He entered Algeria in 2020 for the birth of his child, but was detained and sentenced to three years' imprisonment.
