= Abdelkader Khamri =

Algerian politician

Abdelkader Khamri (Arabic: عبد القادر خمري) is an Algerian politician who was the minister for youth and sport in the 1992 government of Belaid Abdessalam.
