= Mustapha Haciane =

Algerian novelist, playwright, and poet

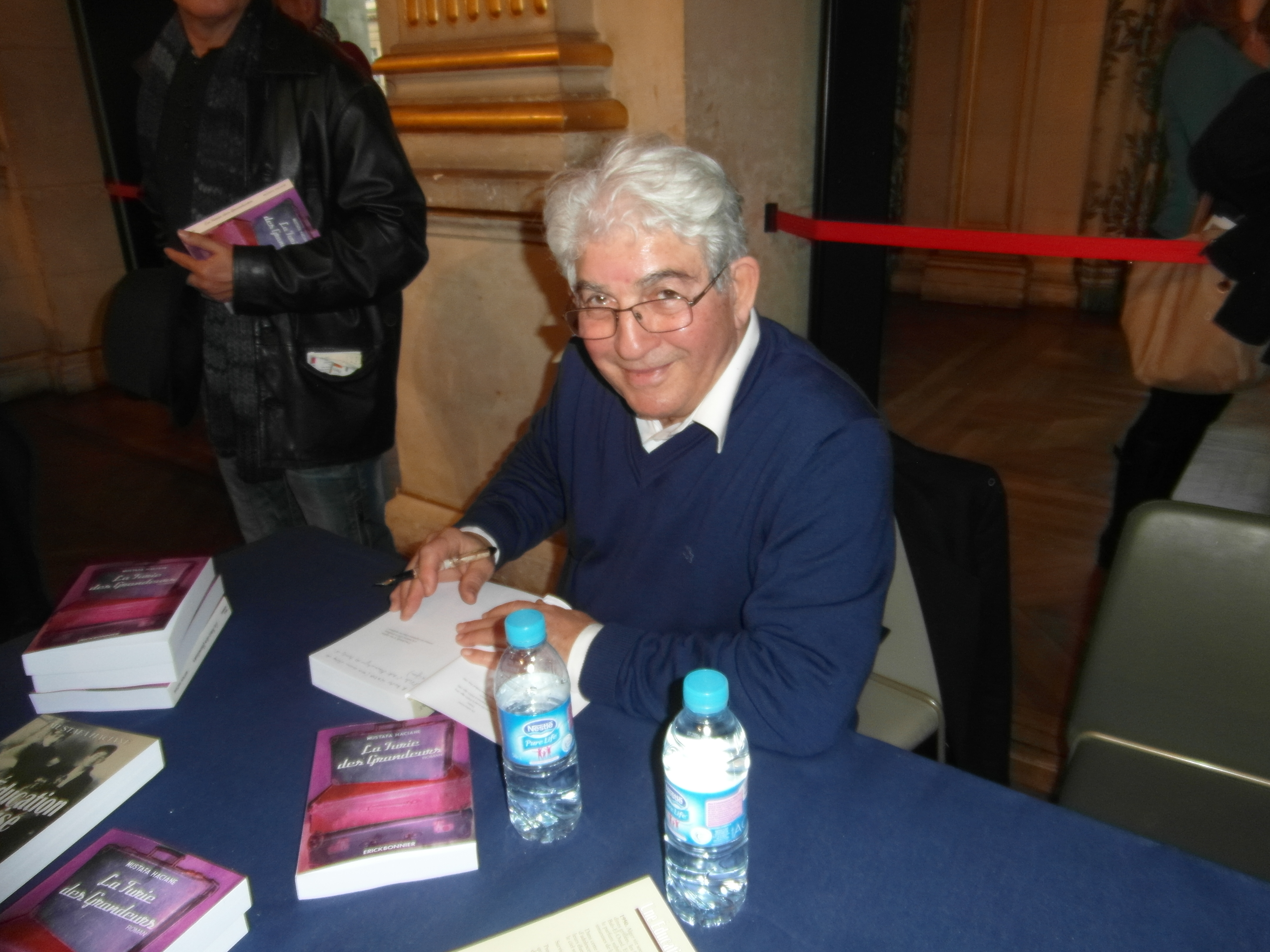
- Born: 1935; Rouiba, Algeria

Mustapha Haciane, also spelt as Mustafa Haciane, (born in 1935) is an Algerian novelist, playwright, and poet. His publications often tackle social issues.

== Biography ==
Mustapha Haciane was born in 1935, in Rouiba, Algeria, into a family of Turkish origin. He began writing poems at the age of 17 whilst in high school. In 1950 he met with Albert Camus, and continued his studies in France and Switzerland.

During his travels, Haciane wrote the play "A quoi bon fixer le soleil" ("What is the point of fixing the sun") which was performed in Geneva in 1967 at the Theatre de l'Atelier.

Back in Algeria he wrote two other pieces: "La Vocation de l'abus" ("The Vocation of Abuse") and "L'Escalier d'en face" ("The Staircase opposite").

In Rio de Janeiro he wrote Les Orphelins de l'Empereur ("The Orphans of the Emperor").

== Personal life ==
Haciane currently resides in Paris.

== Publications ==
=== Novels ===
- Haciane, Mustafa (1982), Quand meurent les cigales, Paris: Publisud
- Haciane, Mustafa (2000), Quand meurent les cigales (Edition gros caractères), Paris: Publisud, ISBN 2866000102
- Haciane, Mustafa (2010), Une Education algéroise, Paris: Koutoubia
- Haciane, Mustafa (2011), Une éducation algéroise, Paris: Editions Encre d'Orient, ISBN 2362430170
- Haciane, Mustafa (2015), La Furie des Grandeurs, Paris: Erick Bonnier, ISBN 2367600341

=== Theater ===
- Haciane, Mustafa (1974), A quoi bon fixer le soleil, Algiers: SNED, ASIN B00A4YVK60
- Haciane, Mustafa (1978), Les Orphelins de l'Empereur, Algiers: SNED
- Haciane, Mustafa (1981), A quoi bon fixer le soleil, Algiers: SNED

== Bibliography ==
- Cheniki, Ahmed (2006), Vérités du théâtre en Algérie, Dar el gharb, ISBN 9961540468
- Déjeux, Jean (1984), "Haciane, Mustapha", Dictionnaire des Auteurs Maghrébins de Langue Française, Karthala, ISBN 2865370852.
