= Marie Soussan =

Jewish-Algerian actress and singer (1895–1977)

Meriem "Marie" Soussan
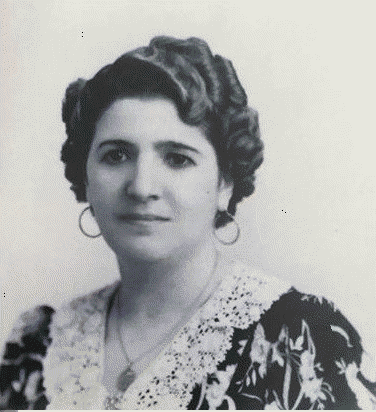
- Born: January 17, 1895; Casbah of Algiers, Algeria
- Died: 1977 (aged 81–82)
- Occupations: Actress and singer
- Years active: 1895-1977

Meriem "Marie" Soussan (in Arabic: ماري سوسان, in French: Marie Soussan, January 17, 1895- 1977) was a Jewish-Algerian actress and singer associated with the rise of the Algerian theater from the early 1930s, and the first woman in an Arab country to appear in the theater (until then men played women roles).

Along with Rachid Ksentini, she became a partner in one of the most popular theater pairs during the interwar period. she also recorded 20 78-rpm records.

== Biography ==
Soussan was born on January 17, 1895, in the lower Casbah of Algiers. Her mother Louna Aboucaya was the maternal aunt of impresario Edmond Nathan Yafil. Similar to so many artists of her times, she practiced her musical skills at family events, where she devoted herself to singing and the darbuka. Sometime after World War I, she joined El Moutribia, the orchestra and theater troupe of her famous cousin Yafil. Her stage debut would seem to have occurred in 1925 at the Casino d’Alger. Over the next fifteen years, she sustained a busy career with El Moutribia, acting and touring alongside her comic partner Rachid Ksentini. Together, the Jewish-Muslim duo became center stage. Many of those acts were then recorded to disc. Soussan, of course, was also a talented solo artist, recording an array of genres, classical and popular, first with Gramophone and then with Polyphon. All of this earned her early membership in the Société des auteurs, compositeurs et éditeurs de musique (SACEM).

She left Algeria in 1959 and embarked on a business career in the southern France, before Algeria gained independence and after a deterioration process in the situation of artists there and Jewish artists in particular following World War II. She died in 1977 in Marseille France, and was buried in the Jewish cemetery in Marseille.

== See also ==
- Rachid Ksentini
