= Ghemati Abdelkrim =

Algerian former politician and writer

Ghemati Abdelkrim (born in 1961 in Cherchell, Algeria) is an Algerian former politician and writer. He was a high-ranking leader of the Islamic Salvation Front. Abdelkrim's vision of an Islamic state included establishing it with a democratic system based on a civil state with an elected president and parliament, as well as an independent justice system and opposition parties.

== Publications ==
- Abdelkrim, Ghemati (1998), "A qui profite l'escalade dans l'horreur?", in Chiclet, Christophe (ed.), La Turquie interpelle l'Europe, Paris: L'Harmattan, pp. 121–127

== Personal life ==
Abdelkrim was born in Cherchell, Algeria, in 1961; his family are of Turkish origin.
