= Rabea Mechernane =

Algerian-Qatari women's rights activist and politician

- Citizenship: Algerian
- Occupations: activist and politician
- Organization: Algerian Literacy Association

Rabea Mechernane, born Rabea Kerzabi is an Algerian-Qatari women's rights activist and politician. She was Algeria's minister of national solidarity and family in the 1990s.

Rabea Kerzabi was the daughter of Mohamed Kerzabi, a revolutionary activist. As minister of national solidarity and family, she co-founded the Algerian Literacy Association (IQRAA). In 2002 she joined the court of Hamad bin Khalifa Al Thani, Emir of Qatar.
