= Reda Doumaz =

Algerian musician

Reda Doumaz (born 1956 in Algiers) is Algerian musician and poet who is considered to be an important figure of the chaâbi music of Algeria, known for his interpretation of hizia and moulet el ain elzarqa (en-tr:the blue eyed lady). He was born and raised in the Casbah of Algiers.

== Biography ==
He grew up in a musical family in a working-class neighborhood, where partying was part of the culture. Although passionate about music, he chose to concentrate first on his studies, at the end of which he applied for an executive position in a national company. He sings about the youth of his country, the working-class neighborhoods of Algiers and the impossible loves; timeless themes that resound and echo with his many many listeners.

Reda Doumaz created an Arabic version of the Spanish song "Bésame mucho", playing it on a double-stringed Algerian mandolin. The cover also features woman vocals reciting some of the lyrics in Spanish.

== Discography ==
- El Attlal (Vestiges)
