= Mourad Benachenou =

Algerian politician

Mourad Benachenou was the Algerian minister for the restructure of industry in the 1995 government of Mokdad Sifi.
