= Benaouda Hadj Hacène Bachterzi =

Algerian politician and publicist

Benaouda Hadj Hacène Bachterzi (1894-1958) was an Algerian politician and publicist. He founded and managed the "Es-Sandjak" ("l’Etandard") and "Le cri indigene" newspapers, which focused on the interests of native Algerian Muslims during French colonial rule. Bachterzi was also actively involved in many associations and was elected a Municipal councilor in Oran at the age of twenty-five.

== Personal life ==
Bachterzi was born in Oran into one of the oldest bourgeoisie families of Turkish origin.
