= Miloud Hmida =

Algerian poet, critic and translator (born 1980)

Miloud Homida ميلود حميدة
- Born: 12 March 1980 (age 46); Djelfa, Algeria
- Occupations: Poet and translator

Miloud Homida (Arabic: ميلود حميدة; born 1980) is an Algerian poet, critic and translator. He was born in Djelfa.

== Publications and activities ==
- Latin pages: impressions of modern Latin literature, the publishing Dar Mime (Assia Ali Mousa).
- Wind of solitude, The Publishing House Linaeditoria, Mexico.
- DACA/ IF; translation of a poem by the Romanian poet Elena Liliana Popescu, with forty other translators, publishing Pelerin, Bucharest.
- Participation in the Spanish-American Anthology, published in Peru and by the poet Leo Zelada, a member of The House of Poetry in Spain.
- A number of translations of several Spanish poets.
