= Colonel Amirouche =

Algerian military leader

Colonel Amirouche Aït Hamouda
- Ɛmiṛuc At Ḥemmuda
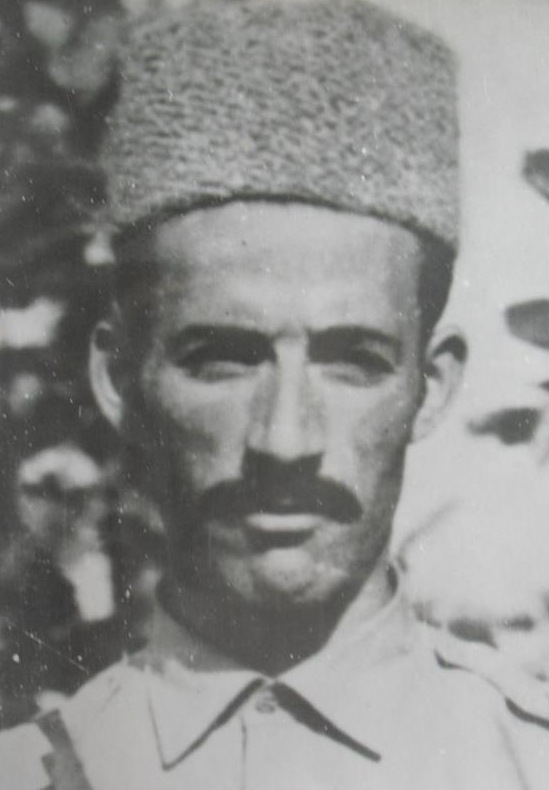
- Born: Amirouche Aït Hamouda; 31 October 1926; Tassaft Ouguemoun, French Algeria (present-day Algeria)
- Died: 29 March 1959 (aged 32); Djebel Zamer, Bou Saâda, French Algeria
- Burial place: El Alia Cemetery
- Military career
- Allegiance: FLN
- Service years: 1950–1959
- Rank: Colonel
- Nicknames: Wolf of Akfadou; Amirouche the terrible
- Conflicts: Algerian War

Amirouche Aït Hamouda (Kabyle: Ɛmiruc At Ḥemmuda Arabic: عميروش آيت حمودة), better known by his nom de guerre Colonel Amirouche, was an Algerian military leader and revolutionary during the Algerian War. He organized the irregular military of the Wilaya III and is considered a national hero in Algeria.

He was killed in action during combat against French troops on 29 March 1959. This event was much publicized, as Amirouche was considered to be a great threat to the French in Algeria.

== Biography ==
He was born on 31 October 1926 in Tassaft Ouguemoun, a small town in the Djurdjura. Orphan, he was the son of Amirouche Aït Hamouda and Fatima Aït Mendes Bent Ramdane. When his father died, he inherited his first name, as tradition required. A year after his birth, his widowed mother took two of her children, Boussad, the eldest, and himself; she left her husband's village to join the hamlet from which she came, Ighil Bwammas, a short distance away. The family of the maternal uncles being itself very poor, the young Amirouche had to learn from an early age to make himself useful in order to survive and, if necessary, to help his mother and his brother, who was three years older than him. In the region, it is customary for boys whose parents have died or are particularly poor to serve in the homes of wealthier families, where they are fed in exchange for assistance bordering on servitude. In this way, people may spend their lives in a form of perpetual servitude, with no guarantee other than that they will be given their daily rations. This status is called 'acrik', which is equivalent to that of the serf in medieval Europe. This was the fate of Amirouche Aït Hamouda from his early childhood. However, he succeeded in getting an education while carrying out his numerous and arduous tasks. These few years at school were decisive in his life: he learned to read and write and developed a capacity for listening that enabled him to satisfy his curious mind all his life.

Amirouche gets involved in politics. He approves of the nationalist leader of the town, Dr Ahmed Francis, who denounces - it is the time of Marcel-Edmond Naegelen's proconsulate - the rigged elections. However, the options he took were more radical than those of the UDMA leader. Not satisfied with joining the MTLD and leaving Relizane to go and work in Algiers as a permanent employee at the headquarters of this movement, place de Chartres, he joined the Special Organisation (abbreviated O.S). When the repression fell on the Special Organisation of the MTLD, in 1950-1951, Amirouche was imprisoned. Released, but forbidden to stay in Algiers, he returned, on his release from prison, to Relizane, but he went to spend Sundays in the capital clandestinely.

Although he was very anti-communist, he often went to visit friends of the PCA newspaper Alger républicain. At that time, according to sources, he seems to have become close to the Association of Algerian Muslim Ulemas.

According to his wartime companion, Cheikh Tahar Ali Aldjet, he had the project of opening zaouias (religious buildings) in Wilaya III with the aim of promoting Arabic and Islam among the population but also to Algerian expatriates. According to his other wartime companion, Salah Mekacher, he also attached great importance to the Arabic language.

The remains of the colonel and his wartime companion Ahmed Ben Abderrazak Hamouda, commonly called Colonel Si El Haouès, were dug up and stored in a barracks in Algiers. An investigation was opened by Chadli Bendjedid in 1981. The investigation made it possible to find their bodies which were recovered by his son and buried in El Alia Cemetery.

== See also ==
- French rule in Algeria
- History of Algeria
- Provinces of Algeria
