= Maamar Benguerba =

Algerian politician

Maamar Benguerba was the Algerian minister for labour and social affairs in the 1992 government of Belaid Abdessalam.
