= Ahmed Ben Triki =

Algerian poet

- Born: Ahmed Ben Triki; 1650; Tlemcen, Ottoman Algeria
- Died: 1750 (aged 99–100)
- Occupation: Poet
- Writing career
- Language: Arabic
- Notable works: My Pain Endures, Burned to the Depths of My Soul

Ahmed Ben Triki, sometimes referred to as Ben Zengli, (1650–1750) was a poet from Tlemcen, in Ottoman Algeria.

== Biography ==
Ahmed Ben Triki was born in Tlemcen, in Ottoman Algeria, in 1650 to a Turkish father. He began writing poetry at an early age and was taught by the poet Saïd El-Mendassi.

== Poetry ==
One of his most notable poems "My pain Endures…" was written in Morocco, in 1652, after the Ottoman authorities banished Ben Triki from Tlemcen. Many of his poems were written during this period of exile and express his painful separation from his homeland.

On his return to Algeria, he mainly composed panegyrics of the Islamic prophet Muhammad. Nonetheless, his poem "Burned to the Depths of My Soul!", a religious poem, was an innovative qasida which praised the Kaaba in Mecca; Ben Triki transposed the Sufi ghazal devices originally applied to the love of God or ones "Beloved" to the description of the physical features of a place.

Ben Triki’s acclaimed poems lead his contemporary Sidi Mohammed Ben Msaieb to praise the poet as follows: "Ben Triki is possessed by a great jinn, but this jinn was mistaken when he chose such a home!".
