= Rachid Ksentini =

Algerian actor and comedian

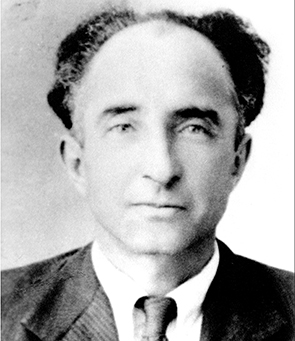
- Born: Rachid Belakhdar; November 11, 1887; Algiers, French Algeria
- Died: August 4, 1944 (aged 56); Algiers, French Algeria
- Occupations: Actor, comedian

Rachid Ksentini (November 11, 1887 – August 4, 1944) was an Algerian actor and comedian.

== Biography ==
Rachid Ksentini was born Rachid Belakhdar on November 11, 1887 in the Casbah of Algiers. He left school early to work as an apprentice carpenter with his father in Bab El Oued until 1914. On the eve of the First World War, he enlisted as a seaman in the merchant navy and left for France. The boat where he embarked was torpedoed by German naval forces. The survivors were rescued by the Royal Navy, and were then transferred to Marseille. As sailor, he traveled to Europe, North America, China, and India. He returned to Algeria but for a short stay before going back to France.

In 1925, he returned to his home country and met the same year in a café, Ali Sellali a.k.a. Allalou who asked him to integrate his theatrical troupe Ezzahia. Their collaboration resulted in the presentation of the play Zaouadj Bouaklin on October 26, 1926, which marks the first appearance of Ksentini on stage. The collaboration between the two men continued with adaptations of sequences from One Thousand and One Nights, where Rachid Ksentine obtained the first role. In 1927, he created with Djelloul Bachedjerrah, the El Djazaïr troupe that disbanded shortly after.

Ksentini emerged mainly in theater, but at the same time invested himself in comedy songs with a social background. Many of his songs are covers or interpolations of Algerian national heritage music, for example with Ach men âr alikoum ya bnaïn ennas, drawn from Ach men âr Alikoum ya rdjal Meknes (a verse from a poem by Kaddour El Alamy).

== Reception ==
A TV series dedicated to the actor was cast in 2005, directed by Boualem Aďssaoui from a screenplay by Rachid Soufi. The series consists of twelve parts of 30 minutes each.

== Death ==
Rachid Ksentini died on August 4, 1944.

== See also ==
- Marie Soussan

== Literature ==
Hachlaf, Ahmed [in French]; Hachlaf, Mohamed Elhabib (2001). Anthologie de la musique arabe, 1906-1960 (in French). Algiers: Éditions Anep. p. 346. ISBN 9789961903513.
