= Hadj M'rizek =

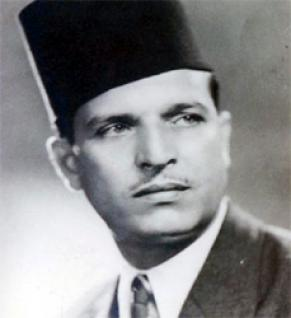
- Hadj M'rizek

Background information
- Birth name: Arezki Chaïeb
- Born: 1912; Algiers, Algeria
- Died: February 12, 1955; Algiers, Algeria
- Genres: Chaabi
- Occupations: Singer, musician (Arabic, French)

Hadj M'rizek (1912 – February 12, 1955) was an Algerian songwriter, lyricist, composer, poet and painter.

== Biography ==
Arezki Chaïeb was born in the Casbah of Algiers in 1912. He is interested in music through his half-brother, a promoter. It follows the performances of the stars of the time as Mustapha Nador.

M'rizek follows a classical music education (tar, darbuka) then his instrument of choice became the mandole. He learns the great texts of folk poetry and works different types of songs starting with the hawzi first before getting to chaâbi. M'rizek had "artistic qualities such as clarity of verbal expression and innate sense of rhythm".

He becomes the star of the casbah in 1929 and participates in festivals in Dellys, Cherchell and the M'zab. His fame arrives in France where he recorded several 78s.

In 1937 he makes his hajj. He also becomes vice president of MC Alger.

He dies on February 12, 1955. M'rizek is buried at El Kettar cemetery.

== Songs ==
- El Mouloudia
- Ya Taha El Amine
- Ya Rebbi Sahelli Zora
- El Qahoua ouel Atay
- Mesbah Ezzine
- Yal qadi
- El bla fi el-kholta
- Youm el djemaâ kherdjou leryam
- Lellah ya ahli aâdrouni
- Goulou leyamna
- âla rassoul el hadi
- kifèche hilti ya nassi

== Bibliography ==
- Saadallah, Rabah (1981). El-Hadj Mʾhamed el-Anka, maître et renovateur de la musique "chaabi" (in French). Algiers: La Maison des Livres. p. 149.
- Ben Achour, Bouziane (2003). Figures du terroir (in French). Algiers: Dar El Gharb. p. 232.
- Guerouabi, Chahira; Rossi, Catherine (2009). El-Hachemi Guerouabi: le jasmin, les roses et le néant (in French). Algiers: Casbah editions. p. 266.
