= Franco-Arab chanson =

French-Arabic music style

- Stylistic origins: Arabic music; Andalusi classical music; Chaabi (Algeria); Chanson; rumba; valse musette; cha-cha-cha; tango
- Cultural origins: 1930s, French Algeria
- Typical instruments: Accordion; Percussion; Oud; Violin; Guitar; Flute; Clarinet; Saxophone; Trumpet; Ney; Piano; Voice

Audio sample
- "La complainte orientale" by Chinita Rivero: file; help

Franco-Arab chanson, also known as chanson francarabe and chanson franco-orientale, is a hybrid musical style with influences of French chanson, Arab-Andalusian classical music, Algerian chaabi and Latin American rhythms. It was mainly popular in colonial Algeria, Tunisia and mainland France from the mid-1930s to the late 1960s.

== Characteristics ==
The Franco-Arab chanson is defined by its synthesis of French chanson with popular music from the Maghreb. The musicians performed with traditional North African instruments, including the oud and darbouka, as well as the violin, piano and accordion. Apart from original compositions derived from Arab-Andalusian classical music, such as Algerian chaabi, Latin dance rhythms were sometimes used, including rumba, cha-cha-cha and tango. The lyrics in vernacular Arabic and French often express humour and social commentary. In contrast to the classical Arab-Andalusian music with its long introductions, the composers wanted it to be light and entertaining for a wide social audience.

This subgenre became popular, and record labels began recording these songs from 1935 onwards. Known as "chanson franco-orientale" or “francarabe” in French, this style flourished further in France after the decolonization of the Maghreb and the emigration of the pieds noirs expatriates in the 1960s.

Mainly French-Algerian Jewish musicians including Reinette l'Oranaise, Line Monty, Lili Labassi, Blond Blond, Salim Halali, Maurice El Médiouni and Lili Boniche recorded popular songs in Algerian Arabic with parts of their lyrics in French. Lili Boniche's composition “علاش ما تحبنيش/Pourquoi tu ne m’aimes pas” (Why don’t you love me), a tango which both French and Algerian Arabic lyrics, is an example of Franco-Arab chanson.

At the same time, music halls in Paris such as El Djezaïr (English: "Algeria") presented "oriental music" and invited artists such as Salim Halali and Line Monty who performed French chansons. Their records were produced by Pathé Marconi and Dounia Records, a label created by Tunisian singer and producer Kahlaoui el Tounsi for the emigrant audience, "nostalgic of the paradise lost."

As they were French colonial subjects, Algerian musicians benefited from relative freedom of movement towards mainland France during the first part of the 20th century. After the Second World War, new venues in the rue de la Huchette and Montmartre including Les nuits du Liban, the Tam-tam and Au Soleil d’Algérie, offered Franco-Arab chansons as part of their musical entertainment. In the early 1960's, Jewish artists from Algeria, having emigrated to France following the Algerian war, continued to write Franco-Arab chansons more frequently than before, as they were especially popular with pied-noirs audiences.

The practice of mixing song lyrics in both French and Arabic has been taken up decades later by singers from the suburbs in French large cities. In the 1980s, songs of the band Carte de Séjour for example, used expressions of North African Arabic in everyday French language that characterized the Franco-Arab chanson of earlier decades.

== Other notable artists ==
- Alice Fitoussi
- Louisa Tounsia
- Enrico Macias

== Filmography ==
In 2006, the French documentary Les Stars du music-hall d'Algérie presented testimonies and archival images of French-Algerian music in Algiers and Oran during the 1940s and 1950s. The same year, a CD, DVD and a graphic novel about some of these interpreters were published titled Alger Oran Paris, Les Années Music-Hall.

== Discography ==
- The very best of Jewish-Arabic song treasures, Buda musique, 2012
- Gala de la chanson francarabe, Milan, 2014
