= Christopher Silver (music historian) =

American academic of modern history, curator and writer

Christopher B. Silver
- Occupations: Associate Professor in Jewish history and culture, curator and writer
- Years active: 2009-present
- Known for: Publications on Jewish-Muslim relations through North African music
- Notable work: Recording History: Jews, Muslims, and Music Across Twentieth Century North Africa
- Awards: L. Carl Brown AIMS Book Prize in North African Studies
- Website: christopherbsilver.com

Christopher Benno Silver is an American academic of modern history, curator and writer based in Canada. He is known for his publications on the 20th-century cultural history of the Maghreb countries Morocco, Algeria, and Tunisia, with a focus on Jewish-Muslim relations through music.

== Life and career ==
=== Early life, higher education and academic career ===
Silver grew up in Los Angeles in a Jewish family. His introduction to the music industry came through his father, Roy Silver. Although not a musician himself, Roy Silver managed the careers of artists including Bob Dylan, Bill Cosby, Joan Rivers, Richard Pryor, among others.

He received his B.A. in History from the University of California, Berkeley in 2005. He continued for his M.A. in 2014 and his PhD. in 2017 at the University of California, Los Angeles (UCLA). Following his C.Phil. thesis of 2015, he published his book Recording History: Jews, Muslims, and Music across Twentieth-Century North Africa in 2022. According to the publishers it is "the first history of the music scene and recording industry across Morocco, Algeria, and Tunisia", providing insight into Jewish-Muslim relations through music. As of 2026 Silver is associate professor in Jewish history and culture in the Department of Jewish Studies at McGill University in Montreal. His subjects of interest are modern Jewish history, the history of 20th-century North Africa and the Middle East, as well as popular culture and music.

=== Recording History ===
As stated in his preface, Silver's 2015 PhD thesis titled Jews, Music-Making, and the Twentieth Century Maghrib was based on his research on colonial-era recordings, European label archives and personal communication in English, French, Arabic, Judeo-Arabic and Hebrew. His 2022 book Recording History: Jews, Muslims, and Music across Twentieth-Century North Africa has been noted for its methodological approach of treating sound recordings as historical sources. As mentioned in a scholarly review, Silver used records as primary evidence for historical analysis rather than viewing them solely as musical artifacts. Silver's archival research, including the collection and digitization of historical recordings and collaboration with descendants of performers, explores aspects of memory and loss along with the histories of music and politics. Following an interdisciplinary approach to the fields of North African history, Jewish and Islamic studies as well as sound studies, this research is not primarily based on official and academic documents or elite narratives, but through "music that moved across borders, communities, and decades."

Following the publication of Recording History, he gave an interview for the German online portal qantara.de about his work. In this interview, Silver said that Recording History emerged from a long-term research process that began in 2009, when a visit to a record store in Casablanca, Morocco, started his interest in the history of recorded music in North Africa. He later recalled that the visit deepened his understanding of the music industry as an interconnected network involving artists, technical staff, record companies, distributors, and audiences extending beyond national borders. After purchasing several records, he began tracing relationships among record labels, artists, composers, and other details, and gradually expanded his record collection. This also led him to investigate the emergence of the recording industry in the Maghreb since the late 19th-century.

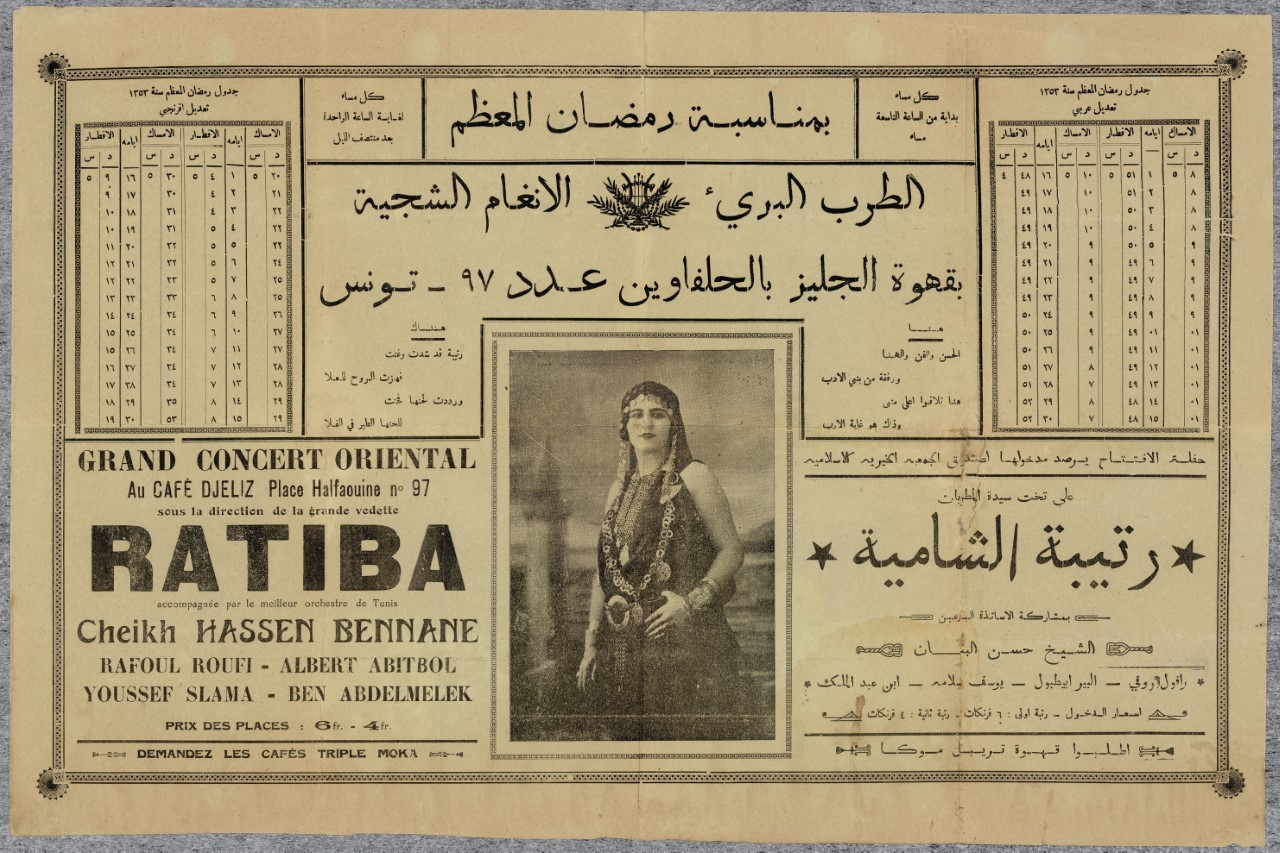
A Ramadan concert poster from 1934 Tunis announcing Jewish and Muslim artists in the same ensemble

With regard to relations between Jewish and Muslim Arabs in North Africa, Silver noted that historians often place the beginning of Jewish–Muslim separation in the late 19th century, especially the 1870 Crémieux Decree in Algeria, which granted French citizenship to Algerian Jews, but not to Muslims, and established different legal statuses for the two communities. Silver posited that the world of North African recorded music complicates established narratives of Jewish–Muslim separation. He argued that musicians and audiences from both communities continued to interact extensively well into the 20th century.

In Recording History, Silver argued that recording technology itself reshaped musical practice. The limited playing time of 78 rpm records required traditional Arabic compositions to be condensed, while the recording industry also contributed to stylistic changes, including faster performances and the adoption of Western instruments such as the piano and harmonium. Further, Western musical influences were especially evident in North African popular music of the interwar period. He mentioned recordings from Tunisia that incorporated dance and popular styles associated with cha-cha-cha, tango, and jazz, which he characterized as highly innovative for their time. Silver stated that many of the period's best-selling records conveyed nationalist, anti-colonial, or otherwise socially critical messages, which he interprets as expressions of a modern Maghrebi identity. The wide circulation of thousands of commercial recordings was accompanied by the development of a transregional musical infrastructure in North Africa, including distribution networks, new performance venues and a star system that helped turn music into a major commercial industry.

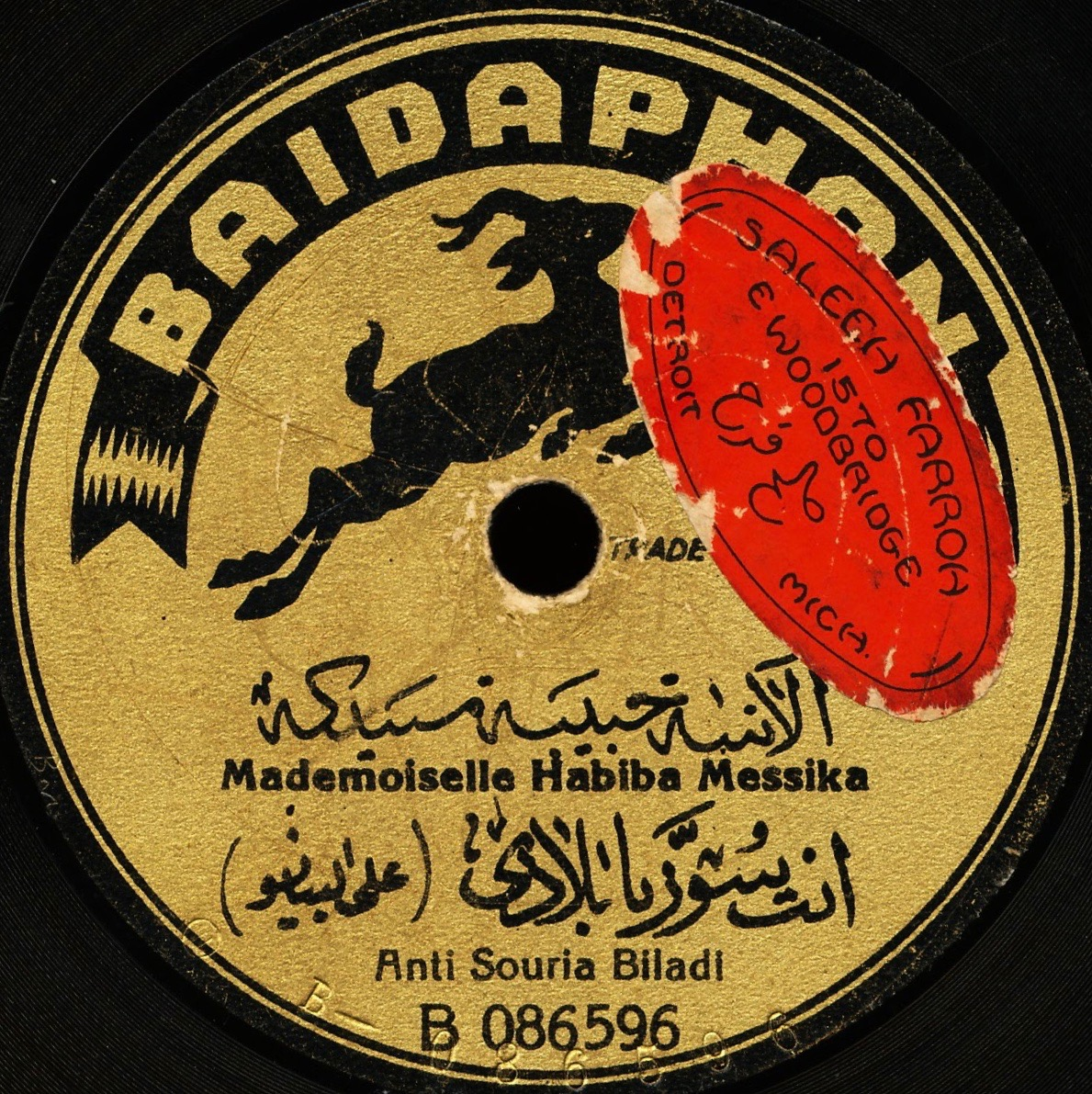
Record label for Habiba Messika's nationalistic song "Anti Souria biladi" (You, Syria, are my country), Baidaphon 1928

With regard to women artists, Silver argued that the history of recorded music is proof of the importance of female performers in North Africa. Some of them were successfully controlling their artistic output and commercial activities, even though men predominated in the industry. According to Silver, this perspective helps address the underrepresentation of women in existing historiography, with Tunisian singer Habiba Msika as an example for the entrepreneurial skills of female recording artists. She secured royalty payments and recorded for several labels at a time when exclusive contracts were common, achievements that Silver noted were exceptional even for her male contemporaries.

As mentioned in the interview, Silver's research drew extensively on colonial archives, as French colonial authorities generated substantial documentary records on music. These authorities closely monitored musical activities for administrative and political purposes. Further, he described surviving commercial recordings as an archive in their own right. His research involves interpreting both the information printed on the records, such as their labels, and other physical features in order to reconstruct historical connections. The digitization and online dissemination of historical recordings through his website Gharamophone has further led to contacts with descendants of the musicians. Finally, Silver argued that the North African recording industry was characterized by close connections among musicians from across the region, many of whom collaborated despite geographical distance. As an especially influential figure, he mentioned Edmond Nathan Yafil, describing his work as fundamental to the history of the region's music industry. Other notable musicians discussed by Silver include Louisa Tounsia, Mahieddine Bachtarzi, Salim Halali, Lili Labassi, Samy Elmaghribi, Lili Boniche, Reinette l’Oranaise and Zohra Al Fassia.

In the preface for his dissertation, Silver commented on his work:

This dissertation rethinks the Jewish-Muslim “relationship” in North Africa (in Arabic, the Maghrib) –– through the figures of Yafil, his disciple Bachetarzi, and others. It is at turns a tale of harmony. At other points it is a narrative of discord. [...] When it came to music, the Jewish-Muslim relationship in Morocco, Algeria, and Tunisia was often intimate, improvised, and delightfully unpredictable. In a way, this was not unlike the music itself.

— Christopher Silver, Jews, Music-Making, and the Twentieth Century Maghrib

== Gharamophone ==
Apart from his scholarly work, Silver publishes Gharamophone, a website based on his personal archive of about 500 records by North African Jewish singers and instrumentalists. This website presents names of the artists and record companies, song titles, recording dates and images of original record labels from the 1930s to 1950s, some of them with links for listening to historical recordings. Gharamophone also has published the digital album Glimpses of North Africa's Musical Past: 1930-1956 with songs by Jewish North African musicians for free streaming. Until 2017, Silver also published his blog Jewish Maghrib Jukebox, covering his special area of interest in Jewish musicians and the music industry in the Maghreb.

== Awards and recognition ==
- L. Carl Brown AIMS Book Prize in North African Studies by the American Institute for Maghrib Studies (AIMS), (2023)
- Certificate of Merit for the 2023 Awards for Excellence in Historical Recorded Sound Research by the Association for Recorded Sound Collections

== Selected publications ==
- Silver, Christopher (January 2023). "Radio Tunis's The Hebrew Hour (1939–56): A Microhistory". Jewish Social Studies. 28 (1): 150–178. doi:10.2979/jewisocistud.28.1.06. ISSN 1527-2028.
- Silver, Christopher (May 21, 2022). "I Sing and I Pray: Samy Elmaghribi's Sonic Reflection on Music and Religion". Canadian Jewish Studies / Études juives canadiennes. 33: 178–190. doi:10.25071/1916-0925.40274. ISSN 1916-0925.
- Silver, Christopher (June 28, 2022). Recording History: Jews, Muslims, and Music across Twentieth-Century North Africa. Stanford University Press. ISBN 978-1-5036-3169-4.
- Silver, Christopher (February 2020). "The Sounds of Nationalism: Music, Moroccanism, and the Making of Samy Elmaghribi". International Journal of Middle East Studies. 52 (1): 23–47. doi:10.1017/S0020743819000941. ISSN 0020-7438.
- Silver, Chris (2016). "Listening to the Past: Music as a Source for the Study of North African Jews". In Boum, Aomar; Marglin, Jessica; Ben-Srhir, Khalid; Kenbib, Mohammed (eds.). Jews of Morocco and the Maghreb: History and Historiography (PDF). Special issue of Hespéris-Tamuda. Vol. L1. Rabat, Morocco: Université Mohamed V. pp. 243–258.

== Reception ==
The book Recording History was peer-reviewed in journals including the International Journal of Middle East Studies, Canadian Jewish Studies and Musica Judaica Online Reviews. The latter noted that Silver realized the importance of popular, aural and mass culture in understanding the MENA region. The Journal of North African Studies named the book "a landmark in the study of the musical cultures of North Africa", and the Tamazgha Studies Journal remarked on the book's "unique corpus of shellac records, forgotten archives, and a decade of ethnographic and archival research", calling it "a compelling narrative that fuses microhistory with broader regional analysis." The review further characterized Silver's methodology as interdisciplinary, combining sound studies, media archaeology, and cultural history within a decolonial framework that prioritizes regional interconnectedness over colonial colonial-era divisions. It also remarked Silver's "humanistic tone" and "poetic and richly narrative" writing. On a critical note, the review missed more than anecdotal information from sources in Arabic language and from North African archives on how everyday Muslim and Jewish audiences experienced and interpreted this music.

Silver's work has also been presented in specialized and general newsmedia, including the Holocaust Encyclopedia of the US Holocaust Memorial Museum, The Times of Israel, the Institut Européen des Musiques Juives, the Jewish Telegraphic Agency, The Canadian Jewish News Magazine, Qantara.de, the New Books Network, History Today, the Jewish Review of Books, Rebooting Jewish Life, and Jadaliyya, as well as in various podcasts.

== See also ==
- Arabic music - Musical regions
- Andalusian classical music
- Leila Sfez
- Raymonde Abecassis
