= Lili Labassi =

French-Algerian musician and composer (1897-1969)

Lili Labassi ليلي العباسي
- Born: Elie Moyal; 17 September 1897; Sidi Bel-Abbes, French Algeria
- Died: 28 April 1969 (aged 71) Nice, France
- Genres: Algerian chaabi, Franco-Arab chanson
- Occupations: Singer, musician, composer
- Instrument: Violin
- Years active: 1920s–1959
- Labels: Parlophone Records, RCA Records

Elie Moyal, better known under his stage name Lili Labassi (Arabic: ليلي العباسي; 17 September 1879 – 28 April 1969) was an Algerian musician, singer and songwriter, mainly known for his interpretations and compositions of Algerian chaabi.

== Background ==
From the early 20th century up to the 1930s, a generation of mainly Jewish and some Muslim musicians started innovating music in the Maghreb by both continuing the traditions of Arab-Andalusian classical music and by introducing new contemporary forms of music. Apart from performing in the traditional cafés and celebrations such as marriages and other private events, their music became increasingly popular through radio broadcasts and the growing recording industry. The lyrics of their songs speak of love and melancholy, exile and nostalgia for the lost paradise of younger days, and of nationalist aspirations for independence.

== Life and career ==
=== Early life ===
Elie Moyal was born in Sidi Bel Abbès, French Algeria, to an Algerian Jewish family in 1897. According to the Crémieux Decree of 1870 that granted French citizenship to Algerian Jews, he was a citizen of France. As a young man, he learned to play the violin and vocal traditions of Arab-Andalusian classical music and became a well-known musician in the 1920s.

Label for Labassi's 78 rpm. record "Ach Hilti", 1932

=== Career ===
Labassi composed songs in the Algerian style of chaabi, one of the popular musical genres of the time, that was derived from Arab-Andalusian music. At the beginning of the 1930s, he recorded his song “Mamak” (“[Don’t Tell] Your Mother”), a foxtrot in Algerian Arabic, for Columbia Records. The song became popular, so that Algerian newspapers repeatedly reported about him performing this song and record catalogues advertised its popularity. “Mamak” was later recorded by other musicians both in Algeria as well as in Morocco. Labassi also performed Franco-Arab chansons with lyrics in both Algerian Arabic and French that became popular from the 1930s onwards. An example for these songs is the 6-minute song "Elle m'appelle l'Oriental" (She calls me the Oriental), published in two versions on a 45 rpm. vinyl record by RCA Records in 1959.

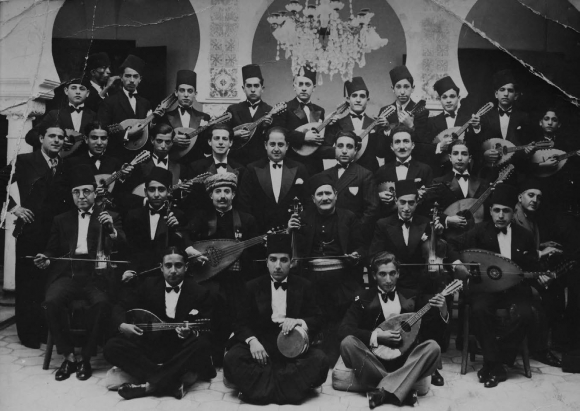
El Moutribia orchestra

Labassi was a member of the El Moutribia and El Andalousia music societies in Algiers and performed also in neighbouring countries. In 1930, he became artistic director for Parlophone records in Algeria. From the 1920s until the end of his career in the late 1950s, he recorded numerous 78 rpm and later 45 rpm vinyl records. According to the book Recording History, Labassi recorded in 1959 for RCA Records the last 78 rpm record ever published. The label's advertisement read: "RCA records presents the famous singer Lilli Labassi and his ensemble."

=== Personal life ===
Labassi left his native country shortly after the independence of Algeria in 1962 for Paris. Afterwards, he lived in Nice until his death in 1969. He was the father of the French actor and musician Robert Castel, who played oud in his father's ensemble.

== Selected discography ==
- Le Maestro du Chââbi, Atoll Music, 1987
- Le Génie du chaâbi vol. 1, 1932-1939, Silver Blue, 1995
- Le Génie du chaâbi vol. 2, 1940-1958, Silver Blue, 1995
- The very best of Jewish-Arabic song treasures, (compilation), Buda musique, 2012

== Reception ==
Labassi's life and career have been reported in books and newsmedia, including the Algerian newspaper of his hometown Sidi Bel Abbès. In his memoir, Algerian musician Maurice El Mediouni remembered his musical collaboration with Labassi. Labassi's songs were commercially reissued in 1995 titled Le Génie du chaâbi vol. 1 and 2. Further, the French National Library (BnF) sound archives digitised excerpts of some of Labassi's songs for their website. As part of their BnF Collection, the same institution shared other songs by Labassi in their BnF edition World - Maghreb and Moyen Orient through numerous streaming platforms.

In his review of Labassi's two 1995 albums published by his son Robert Castel and titled Le Génie du chaâbi vol. 1 and 2, French journalist François Bensignor considered Labassi a "determinant" factor in the development of Arab-Andalusian music. Acccording to this review, even El Hadj El Anka and numerous other musicians of Algerian chaabi were inspired by Labassi's "abundant works." The first album presented "great classical" songs restaured from 78 rpm discs, such as "Ya Bechar", "Ya Kelbi Testehal" and "La Guelsa di Fes." In the second volume of originally 45 rpm. vinyls, the reviewer noted a "vague influence of Western music hall."

== Scholarly studies ==
Since the 2020s, Labassi and his music have been discussed in studies about the history of music in the Maghreb. In his book Recording History: Jews, Muslims, and Music across Twentieth-Century North Africa, music historian Christopher Silver wrote that musicians such as Salim Halali, Samy Elmaghribi, Louisa Tounsia and Labassi were some of the "most audible and influential cultural figures of an era of profound change and critical importance", as Morocco, Algeria and Tunisia were initiating their respective political future after the end of French colonial rule. As Silver added, "The records of these and other artists set the tone for the period in question."

Silver reported that between the 1930s and the 1950s, French colonial authorities imposed censorship on Arabic-language records in the Maghreb. Writing about Labassi's song “O you, who is going to the Sahara”, Silver described how French officials in Morocco tried to suppress the records for their perceived nationalist message. According to Silver, they were "recorded in Algiers, pressed in Paris, shipped back to Algeria, moved overland into Morocco at Oujda, and then fanned out across the Protectorate...and were later found by French police in cafés and brothels." This same instance of French censorship of Labassi's song suspected to be an expression of his nationalist attitudes was discussed in the book Jewish-Muslim Interactions: Performing Cultures Between North Africa and France.

Among other aspects of Labassi's career, scholars have noted the long-standing musical cooperation between Muslim and Jewish musicians in the Maghreb, including their shared appreciation with audiences of both religious groups. In the preface of his dissertation Jews, Music-Making, and the Twentieth Century Maghrib, Silver wrote:

This dissertation rethinks the Jewish-Muslim “relationship” in North Africa (in Arabic, the Maghrib) –– through the figures of Yafil, his disciple Bachetarzi, and others. It is at turns a tale of harmony. At other points it is a narrative of discord. [...] When it came to music, the Jewish-Muslim relationship in Morocco, Algeria, and Tunisia was often intimate, improvised, and delightfully unpredictable. In a way, this was not unlike the music itself.

— Christopher Silver, Jews, Music-Making, and the Twentieth Century Maghrib

== See also ==
- Reinette L'Oranaise
- Lili Boniche
- Salim Halali
- Line Monty
- Enrico Macias
