= Maurice El Médiouni =

Algerian musician (1928–2024)

- Born: 18 October 1928; Oran, French Algeria
- Died: 25 March 2024 (aged 95) Herzliya, Israel
- Genres: Algerian chaabi, Franco-Arab chanson, World music, Raï
- Occupations: Pianist, singer-songwriter
- Instrument: Piano
- Years active: 1942-2006
- Labels: Piranha Records, Buda Musique
- Award: BBC Radio 3 World Music Awards 2007

Maurice El Médiouni, also spelled Maurice el Medioni, (Arabic: مــوريــس الــمــديــونــي; 18 October 1928 – 25 March 2024) was an Algerian pianist, songwriter and interpreter of Algerian chaabi, Franco-Arab chanson, raï and world music. He is known for his performances in the 1950s and 1960s with other artists from the Maghreb such as Lili Labassi, Line Monty, Lili Boniche, Samy el Maghribi, and Reinette l’Oranaise.

In his later years, he attracted new acclaim with albums such as Café Oran and Descarga Oriental, the latter with Cuban-American jazz musician Roberto Rodriguez, gaining the 2007 BBC Radio 3 World Music Award.

== Biography ==
Maurice El Médiouni was born in the Jewish quarter of Oran, French Algeria on 18 October 1928, into a family of musicians. His uncle was the musician Messaoud El Mediouni, known as "Saoud l'Oranais", who died in the 1940s at the Sobibor extermination camp. At age nine, he reportedly began to play the piano. After the Allied invasion of Algeria in 1942, he performed in bars popular with American soldiers and learned to play jazz, boogie woogie and Cuban rumba.

Following the Algerian War of Independence in the early 1960s, El Médiouni moved to Paris, France, where he worked as a tailor as well as occasionally backing Jewish singers. In 1967 he opened a clothing factory in Marseille and took a break from his musical career, which he resumed in the 1980s. In his later years, he was based in France and Israel, performing solo or with other North African Muslim and Jewish artists, who had originally accompanied him nearly half a century earlier in Algeria and France.

His 1997 album Café Oran, where he was joined by American jazz musicians David Krakauer and Frank London, ushered in a new phase in his career. On this and later albums, he also sang Franco-Arab chansons with lyrics in both Algerian Arabic and French. Examples are his "Bienvenue/Abiadi" and "Ahlan oua sahlan", the former song being the opening track of The Rough Guide to Mediterranean Caf (2004). El Médiouni played piano on two tracks of Algerian-born musician Khaled's 2004 album Ya-Rayi. In 2007, El Médiouni joined the El Gusto orchestra of Jewish and Muslim musicians of Algerian chaabi. On 27 January 2013, at age 84, he played a two-hour concert at the Musée d’Art et d’Histoire du Judaïsme in Paris that was published under the title Oran-Oran. Live in Paris.

=== Personal life ===
El Médiouni was married to Juliette Amsellem until her death in 2022, and the couple had three children. He died at a care home in Herzliya, Israel, on 25 March 2024, at the age of 95.

== Discography ==
- Oran-Oran. Live in Paris. (Buda Musique, 2013)
- Maurice El Medioni meets Roberto Rodriguez. Descarga Oriental. The New York Sessions (Piranha Records, 2006)
- Samai Andalou. (2006)
- Pianoriental (Buda Musique, 2000)
- Samai andalou (Magda, 2000)
- Café Oran (Piranha Records/Night & Day, 1997)

== Awards ==
- 2007 BBC Radio 3 World Music Award, Culture Crossing category, for Descarga Oriental with Roberto Rodriguez

== Reception ==
Mediouni's memoir, From Oran to Marseille, edited by British radio presenter Max Reinhardt, was published by Repeater Books in 2017. His style of playing the "piano oriental", was described in Le Monde as a "mixed, flowery style, a kind of instrumental version of the Franco-Arab chanson. In an obituary for the New York Times, Médiouni was regarded as the "grandfather" of Algerian pop music.

The El Gusto orchestra was featured in the 2012 documentary film about the reunion of Jewish and Muslim musicians of the Algerian chaabi tradition, with El Médiouni appearing on stage. In 2017, filmmakers Lynda Myer-Bennett and Clive Myer produced a documentary film titled Maurice El Médiouni. The Birth of PianOriental.
