= Baidaphon =

Defunct German record label for Arabic music

Baidaphone
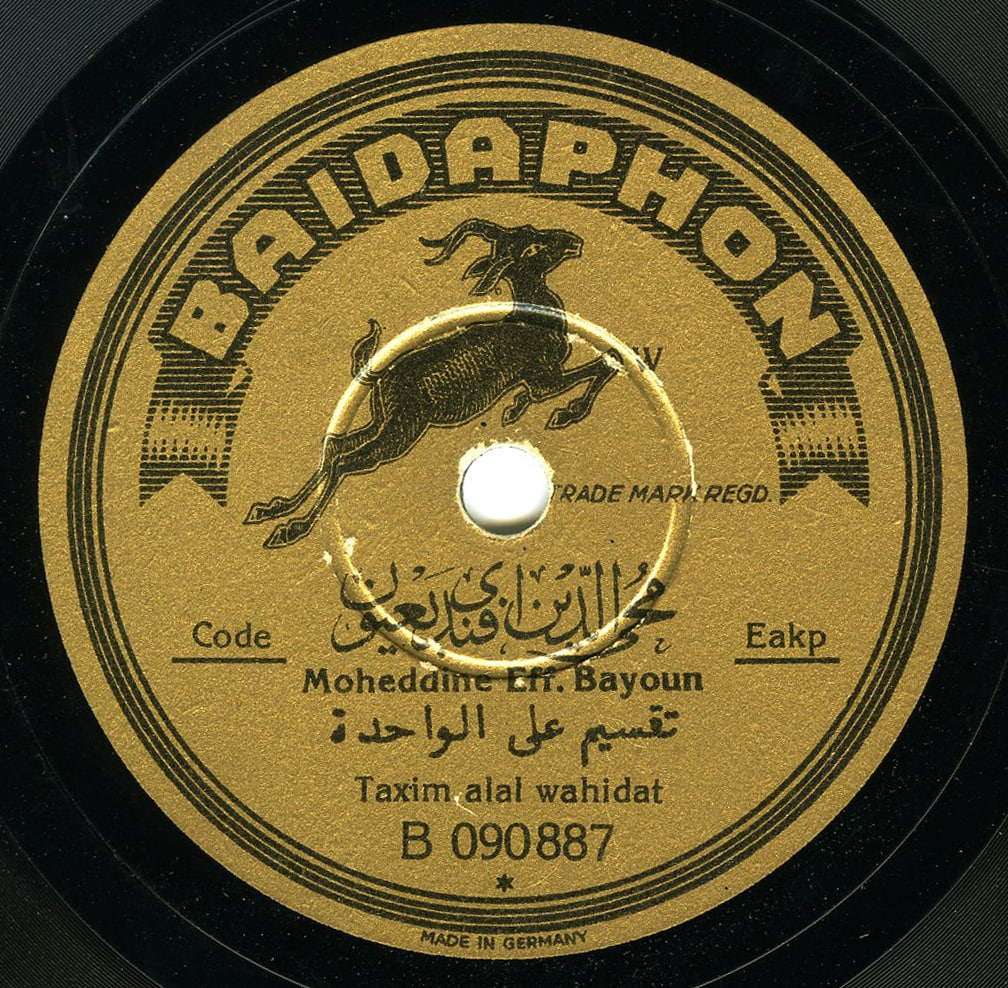
- Baidaphon 78 rpm record, c. 1930
- Founded: 1906
- Founder: Baida family from Beirut
- Genre: Arabic music, Middle Eastern music
- Country of origin: Germany
- Location: Berlin, Beirut

Baidaphon, also spelled Baïdaphone, was a record label and distribution company established in Berlin in the early 20th century by members of the Baida family from Beirut. Due to the label's choice of popular Arabic musical artists and branch offices across the Middle East and North Africa, it became one of the most successful recording companies in the Arab world during the 1920s and 1930s.

== History ==
Founded in 1906 by members of the Baida family, the company initially served as a vehicle for recording and distributing the songs of the singer Farajallah Baida before expanding into one of the leading record companies specializing in Arabic-language music. In the beginning, Baidaphon collaborated with the German record company Lyrophon, which manufactured and distributed Baidaphon's recordings. Following Lyrophon's acquisition by Carl Lindström AG, Baidaphon continued their activities under the new partnership, registering the Baidaphon trademark in 1912 together with its distinctive gazelle logo. After the First World War, the company remained under the management of members of the Baida family while its phonograph records continued to be pressed in Germany.

During the 1920s and 1930s, Baidaphon developed their recording network throughout the Arab world. Recording expeditions were conducted in countries including Algeria, Lebanon, Iraq, Kuwait, and other Gulf states, while branch offices were established in Beirut, Damascus, Baghdad, and Cairo. The label also distributed their recordings internationally through mail order sales from Berlin, serving Arab diaspora communities in Europe, the Americas, and elsewhere.

"Aldahre Kataâ Awsali" ("Fate Has Torn Me Apart") by Mounira El Mahdeya (Baidaphon No. 23045).

By the interwar period, Baidaphon had become one of the successful producers of Arabic commercial recordings. Recruiting leading singers and traditional musicians from across the Middle East and North Africa, Baidaphon contributed to the growth of the regional recording industry. The circulation of their recordings also attracted the attention of French colonial authorities in the Maghreb, who viewed the dissemination of Arabic-language music as a possible vehicle for pan-Arab and nationalist sentiment.

In the late 1920s, Baidaphon signed the Egyptian singer and composer Mohammed Abdel Wahab, for whom it produced specially designed record sleeves. Following the death of Pierre Baida in the early 1930s, the company reorganized its operations and introduced subsidiary labels for particular markets. In Egypt, the Cairo branch was rebranded as Cairophon, while a separate label, Tahaphone, was established in Yemen. Baidaphon continued issuing recordings in the Levant and North Africa, with major sales during the 1920s and 1930s. As German writer Armin Wegner, who knew the Middle East through his extended journeys, wrote, the label "has provided the entire East with records of Arabic songs [...] has recruited for this the best folk singers and musicians of the countries and has made a fortune of a million dollars in very short time."

After the rise of the Nazi regime in Germany, the company ceased manufacturing records there and transferred production to facilities in France by Pathé, Switzerland, and other European countries. Baidaphon remained active into the 1940s, but following the restructuring of its Egyptian operations into Cairophon and the disruptions of the Second World War, the company gradually disappeared from the recording industry. The exact date of its dissolution is unknown.

== Artists ==
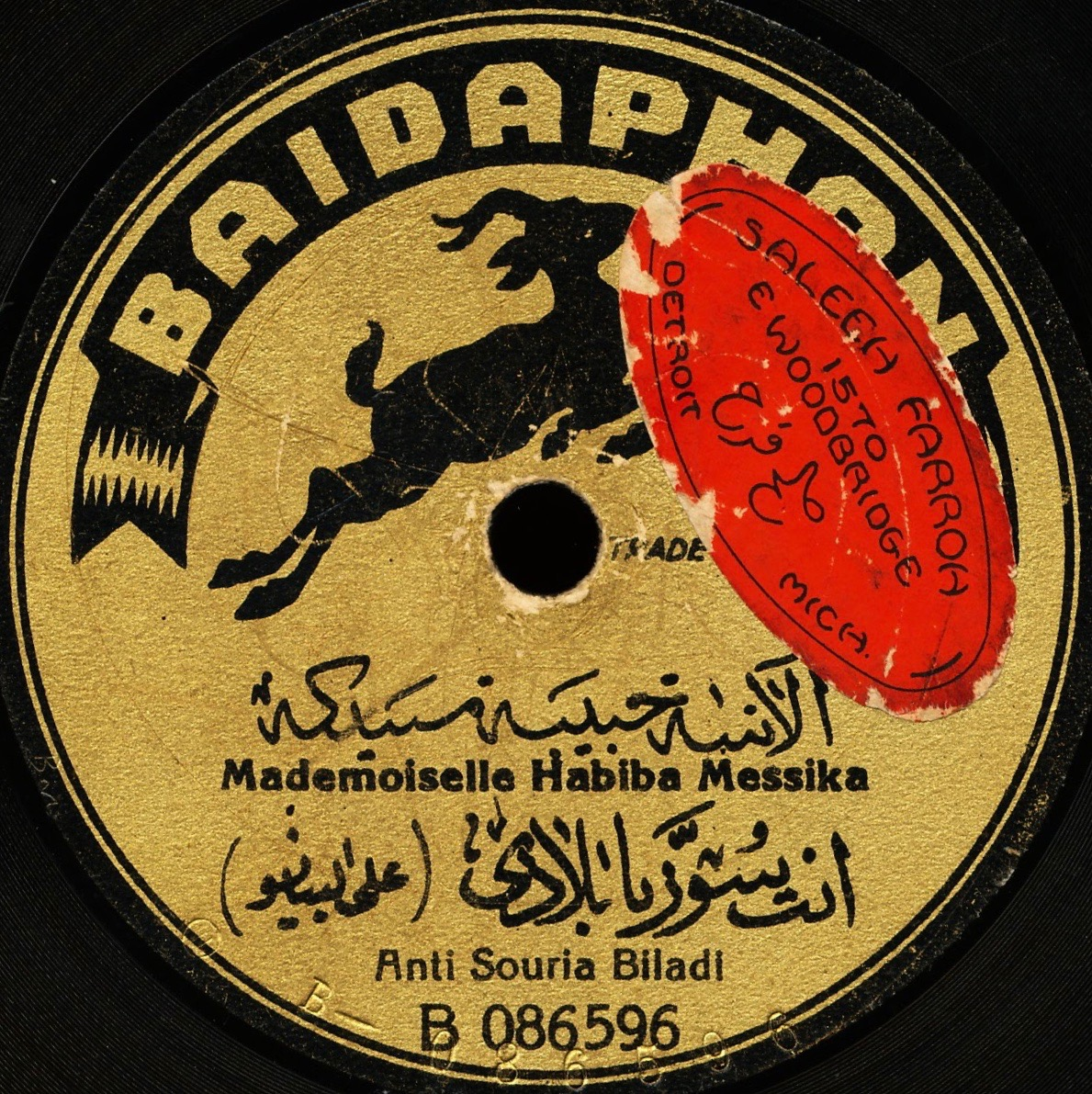
Label for the Arabic song "Anti Souria Biladi" by Habiba Msika

Baidaphon recorded many of the leading singers and musicians of the early 20th-century Arab world. Among its artists were Mohammed Abdel Wahab, Umm Kulthum, Mounira El Mahdeya, Asmahan, Farid al- Atrash, Leila Mourad, Zaki Mourad, Halim El Roumi, Cheikh El Afrit, Cheikh Hamada, Mahieddine Bachtarzi, Abdelkader El-Khaldi, and Habiba Msika. Recording in Berlin in 1928, Msika, who supported Arab nationalist movements, used the absence of French colonial supervision in her native Tunisia to record the song "Anti Souria Biladi" ("You are my country, Syria") and an ode to King Fuad of Egypt entitled, “Ya man yahounnou al-Bey Fouadi” ("O Bey Fuad, to Whom My Heart Is Devoted").

Although the label specialized in Arabic-language music, its catalogue also included recordings reflecting the linguistic and cultural diversity of the eastern Mediterranean and the Middle East. These comprised Greek Orthodox liturgical music, Turkish instrumental works, and songs performed in Armenian, Assyrian, Kurdish, Azerbaijani, and Hebrew.

== Reception ==
The most extensive archive with more than 600 historical records by Baidaphon has been archived by the Centre des Musiques Arabes et Mediterranéenes in Tunisia. Nearly 200 Baidaphon records are archived in the Berlin Phonogram Archive, and the archive of the French National Library comprises about 250 records. Baidaphon's office in Beirut was destroyed during the Lebanese civil war in 1987.

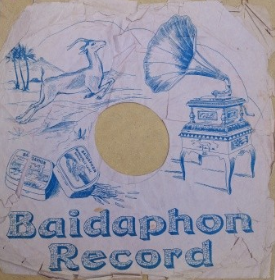
Record sleeve for a Baidaphon record, 1920s

Based on his research of the history of the shellac records made in Germany, the discographer Rainer Lotz published various Baidaphon labels and associated information from the company's. Further, the sound archive of the British Library contains record sleeves by Baidaphon and Cairophon that have been interpreted by the Qatar Digital Library as testimonies of the cultural and social history of the Arab world.

In articles about Habiba Msika, his dissertation of 2017 and his book Recording History: Jews, Muslims, and Music across Twentieth-Century North Africa, music historian Christopher Silver addressed both commercial and artistic aspects of historically important producers of Arabic records, including Baidaphon.

At the end of July 2020, the Museum of European and Mediterranean Civilisations (MUCEM) in Marseille opened the exhibition L’Orient sonore, Musiques oubliées, Musiques vivantes (“The Sounding Orient, Forgotten Music, Living Music”). In cooperation with the Amar Foundation in Beirut, the history of forgotten musical traditions in the Arab world was presented including records by Baidaphon and other recording companies.

== See also ==
- Arabic music
- Middle Eastern music
- Egyptian Music
- Music of Syria
- Music of Lebanon
- Music of Tunisia
