= Louisa Tounsia =

Tunisian singer (1905-1966)

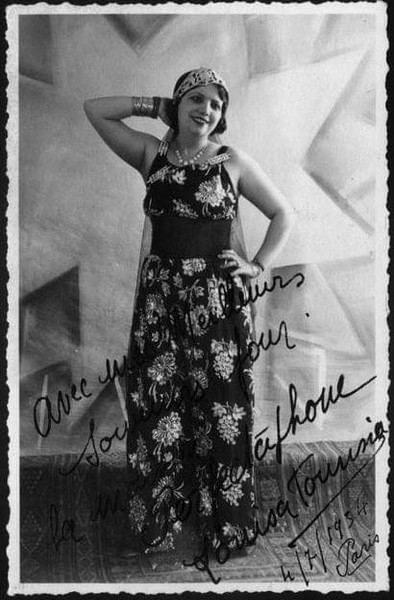
- Louisa Tounsia, c. 1934

Background information
- Born: Louisa Saadoun; 1905; Tunis, French Protectorate of Tunisia
- Died: 1966 (aged 60–61)
- Genres: Arabo-Andalusian music, Arabic pop, Franco-Arabic music
- Occupation: Singer
- Years active: mid-1920s to 1961
- Labels: Columbia, Gramophone, Pacific

Louisa Tounsia (Arabic: لويزة التونسية; 1905 – 1966), born Louisa Saadoun, was a Tunisian singer. Active from the mid-1920s until the 1960s, she became one of the first North African performers to achieve wide prominence in the Maghreb and France. Her repertoire included both Tunisian subgenres of traditional Arabo-Andalusian music as well as modern styles of popular Arabic music, which she recorded for major record companies of her time.

== Biography ==
Louisa Tounsia ("Louisa the Tunisian") was born in a Jewish family in Tunis, then part of the French protectorate of Tunisia, in 1905. She was part of a wave of Jewish female artists who shaped the popular music scene in Tunisia and beyond after the death of the country's first superstar Habiba Msika. Her career as a popular singer started in the mid-1920s, and by the 1930s she became known as Tunisia's new female star of popular music.

Like many performers of her generation, Tounsia participated in the rapid expansion of the recording industry during the mid-20th century. Comprising both subgenres of the Arabo-Andalusian music tradition and lighter popular forms that appealed to urban audiences, this repertoire reflected the changing musical tastes in the Maghreb. Between the two world wars, Tounsia's songs were celebrated in newspaper coverage and record label publicity as expressions of modern Tunisian music. In 1931, she toured Morocco which was called “a triumph of unprecedented proportions” by the newspaper L'Echo d'Alger calling her "Tunisia's first superstar".

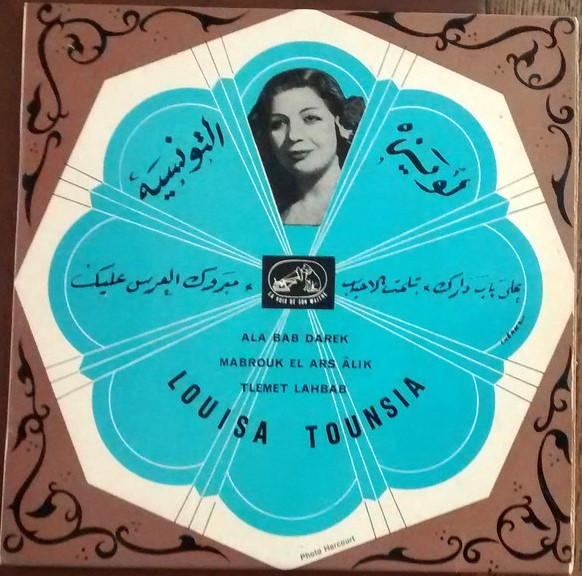
Record sleeve for 45 rpm vinyl record "Ala Bab Darek"

A prolific entertainer, Tounsia recorded 78 rpm and later 45 rpm vinyl records in Arabic and French for several of the principal recording companies operating in the region, including Gramophone, Pacific, and Polyphon. Her song "Chérie, combien je t'aime" ("Darling, how much I love you") was later covered as "Elli yachek hram" by Reinette l'Oranaise, and also by Lili Boniche. Among other well-known songs in her repertoire is her 1945 recording "Ala Bab Darek" ("At the Door of Your House"), a song that was later covered by Tunisian musician Emel Mathlouthi.

These commercial recordings helped promote her performances throughout the Maghreb and Europe. During her visits to Paris, Tounsia performed at the Al-Djazaier and the Tam-Tam cabarets in the Latin Quarter that was run by the father of the prominent Algerian singer Warda. In contrast to other musical performances of the time, where audiences were frequently separated by class or gender, Tounsia attracted large and diverse audiences comprising members of the elite and popular classes, men and women, and both Muslim and Jewish listeners. Following one such concert in 1930, a French visitor remarked a “complete fusion of all of the classes of native society of Tunis who have come out to applaud Louisa la Tounsia.”

== Personal life ==
Louisa Saadoun was married to the musician Zaki Khraïef, who composed several of her songs. She died in 1966.

== Reception ==
In his book Recording History: Jews, Muslims, and Music across Twentieth-Century North Africa, music historian Christopher Silver wrote that musicians such as Salim Halali, Samy Elmaghribi, Louisa Tounsia and Lili Labassi were some of the "most audible and influential cultural figures of an era of profound change and critical importance", when Morocco, Algeria and Tunisia were initiating their respective political future after the end of French colonial rule. As Silver added, "The records of these and other artists set the tone for the period in question."

Louisa Tounsia has been regarded as one of the pioneering North African women who contributed to the development of commercial Arabic music during the first part of the 20th century. Her surviving records are preserved in public and private collections and continue to be studied by historians of Arabic music and the early recording industry. The Tunisian National Sound Archive at the Centre of Arab and Mediterranean Music in Sidi Bou Said holds a collection of Tounsia's records from 1929 to 1945. Records from her later career between 1949 and 1962 are kept in the archives of the French National library. Some of her recordings have been reissued on CD and are available on online video and streaming platforms.

French writer Jonathan Saadoun published a biography titled Le destin de Louisa (The Destiny of Louisa) in 2026. Based on his research, the author aims to recall the life and career of this "monument of Oriental and Andalusian music".

In his 2017 PhD thesis Jews, Music-Making, and the Twentieth Century Maghrib, music historian Christopher Silver gave a detailed account of Tounsia's career and the changing character of the musical scene in Tunisian society. Among other aspects, he commented on a picture of her on the cover of the Columbia Records 1931 Tunisian record supplement: Dressed both in traditional and modern European clothes, Silver noted how Tounsia exemplified the image that record companies sought to convey: North African music as a contemporary musical form, shaped by both local and European cultural influences.

As Silver wrote, the modern character of her music derived in part from its provocative themes and its departure from the Andalusian classical music tradition, which included her blending of French and Arabic lyrics. He also argued that her songs expressed modernity through their critique of male-dominated society. According to Silver, in the song "Heukm Ennessouane" ("The Government of Women", and freely translated as "Empowering Women") Tounsia urges her female contemporaries to embrace new opportunities while warning them against male domination and control.

Recalling a performance he had attended in 1931 at a concert hall in the port of La Goulette, French novelist Pierre Mac Orlan wrote in his travelogue: "When the curtain is raised, one takes in the orchestra on stage: a virtuoso pianist, ‘ud and cymbal players, a violinist, a darbuka player, and a young man who rattles iron castanets. This group resembles, with its hint of solemnity, a council of ministers.” But, “when Louisa appears, the entire concert hall cheers for her; the clapping of hands never ceases." Finally, the ovation of the audience did not end before “the little brunette singer, graceful yet soft, wearing an apple-green silk robe adorned with sewn scarlet roses, signaled for silence.”

== See also ==
- Music of Tunisia
- Arabic music
- Franco-Arabic music
