= Lili Boniche =

French-Algerian musician (1922–2008)

Lili Boniche ليلي بونيش
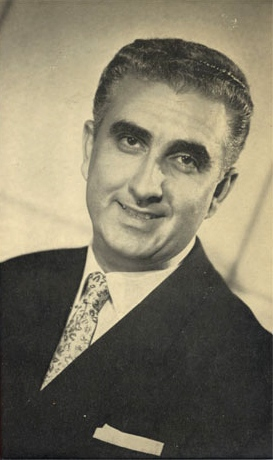

Background information
- Born: Eliaou Élie Boniche; 29 April 1922; Casbah of Algiers, French Algeria
- Died: 6 March 2008 (aged 85) Paris, France
- Genres: Chaabi, Franco-Arab chanson
- Occupations: Singer, musician, composer
- Instruments: Mandola, Guitar
- Years active: 1930s–1950s, 1998–1999
- Labels: Pacific Records, APC, East West, Créon Mélodie

Lili Boniche, born Eliaou Élie Boniche (Arabic: ليلي بونيش; 29 April 1922 – 6 March 2008) was a French-Algerian singer and songwriter. From the 1930s and up to the end of his career in the late 1990s, he was mainly known as composer and interpreter of Franco-Arab chansons in Morocco, French Algeria and mainland France.

== Life and career ==
=== Early life and education ===
Born as the first of four children into a modest Algerian Jewish family in the Casbah of Algiers, Boniche taught himself to play his father's mandola at a young age. After his initiation to classical Arab-Andalusian music and the popular Algerian hawzi style by the renowned musician Saoud L'Oranais for three years, he was accepted at El Moutribia, the society for Arab-Andalusian music in Algiers, at the end of the 1930s. During the 1930s, Boniche became a popular singer-songwriter of Algerian chaabi. He went on concert tours including to neighbouring Morocco and at age 15 had his own show every Monday at the Algiers Opera House. Until shortly before World War II, he appeared along with Muslim musicians such as Mustapha Skandrani on the Arabic programmes of Radio Algers.

When the regime of Vichy France introduced anti-Jewish laws at the end of 1940, he could no longer be heard on the radio, and his French citizenship, that he held as all other Algerian Jews since the Crémieux Decree of 1870, was revoked.

Label for Boniche's record "Marché Noir", 1947

After the Allied landings in North Africa at the end of 1942, Boniche was able to publicly perform again. He recorded his 6-minute song “Marché Noir” (Black Market) on both sides of a 78 rpm record, whose lyrics expressed the dire situation of Jews and Muslims in wartime North Africa. The words speak of the "deprivations of the Vichy years, of survival despite all odds, of food rations, and of the emergence of a notorious and devastating black market." In 1946, he performed at the Soleil d'Algérie, a music hall near Place Pigalle in Paris, where later French president François Mitterand used to listen to his songs.

=== Franco-Arab chanson ===
Boniche popularized the hybrid subgenre of Franco-Arab chansons, sometimes incorporating Latin American rhythms such as tango, pasodoble and mambo into his repertoire. According to historian Benjamin Stora, this corresponded to an interest in exoticism that emerged after the Colonial Exhibition of 1931. In response to this, a new generation of musicians created songs inspired by French chansons, mixing French and Arabic lyrics with Latin music. The composition “علاش ما تحبنيش/Pourquoi tu ne m’aimes pas” (Why don’t you love me), a tango which both French and Algerian Arabic lyrics, is an example of this popular style. Another song from 1950 was “Carmelita,” named after a Spanish woman, with "Bambino", "l’Oriental" and "Alger, Alger" among Boniche's well-known songs.

=== Later life and second career ===
Boniche retired from performing in the 1950s after marrying a French countess, and only played in private celebrations. He went back to Algiers, where he became a businessman, owning four cinemas. In 1962, he left Algeria again following the end of the war for the country's independence from France.

In 1997, Labassi performed for the French movie Would I Lie to You?, with the original soundtrack published by Sony music France. In the 1982 drama movie The Big Pardon by Alexandre Arcady, Boniche played himself as an Algerian Jewish musician. In 1998, he returned to the recording studio, when he played guitar alongside the Algerian-born pianist Maurice El Mediouni and others for the album Boniche Dub. This album, produced by Bill Laswell and Jean Touitou, with Laswell also performing on bass, synthesizer, and drum programming, earned Boniche new fans as the "crooner of the Casbah." This was followed by other albums using the master tapes owned by his daughter for remastered versions, paying tribute to Boniche, who was called "an equivalent figure to Ibrahim Ferrer of the Buena Vistas, [...] bringing back to life a bygone era".

In November 1999, Boniche gave a sold-out concert at the Olympia in Paris, playing Algerian chaabi and his Franco-Arab chansons with Maurice El Médiouni on piano. Commenting on the classification Jewish-Arabic music, Boniche reportedly said: “Do they say a Muslim musician plays Islamo-Arab music? I play Arabic music, that's all!”

Boniche died in Paris on 6 March 2008.

== Discography ==
- Boniche Dub, APC,1999
- Il n'y a qu'un seul Dieu (live à l'Olympia), East West Warner Music France, 1999
- Alger, Alger, (remastered version), 2003
- Œuvres récentes , APC Play it Again Sam, 2003
- Boniche Dub II, (remix), APC, 2004
- Anthologie, 2012
- The very best of Jewish-Arabic song treasures, (compilation), Buda musique, 2012
- Lili Boniche. Trésors de la Musique Judéo-Arabe, World Village, 2014

== Reception ==
In 2006, the French documentary Les Stars du music-hall d'Algérie presented testimonies and archival images of French-Algerian music including Lili Boniche in Algiers and Oran during the 1940s and 1950s. The same year, a CD, DVD and a graphic novel about some of these interpreters were published titled Alger Oran Paris, Les Années Music-Hall.

In the preface for his dissertation Jews, Music-Making, and the Twentieth Century Maghrib, music historian Christopher Silver commented:

This dissertation rethinks the Jewish-Muslim “relationship” in North Africa (in Arabic, the Maghrib) –– through the figures of Yafil, his disciple Bachetarzi, and others. It is at turns a tale of harmony. At other points it is a narrative of discord. [...] When it came to music, the Jewish-Muslim relationship in Morocco, Algeria, and Tunisia was often intimate, improvised, and delightfully unpredictable. In a way, this was not unlike the music itself.

— Christopher Silver, Jews, Music-Making, and the Twentieth Century Maghrib

== See also ==
- Reinette L'Oranaise
- Lili Labassi
- Salim Halali
- Line Monty
- Enrico Macias
