= Msika =

Msika is a surname. Notable people with the surname include:

- Habiba Msika, Tunisian singer, dancer and actress
- Joseph Msika, Zimbabwean politician
