= Fitoussi =

Fitoussi is a Maghrebi Jewish surname. Notable people with the surname include:

- Alice Fitoussi (1916–1978), Algerian singer and musician
- Bruno Fitoussi (born 1958), French poker player
- Elli Robert Fitoussi (born 1947), French singer and musician
- Grégory Fitoussi (born 1976), French actor
- Jean-Paul Fitoussi (1942–2022), French economist
- Marc Fitoussi (born 1974), French film director and screenwriter
- Michèle Fitoussi (born 1954), French writer
