= Line Monty =

French-Algerian singer

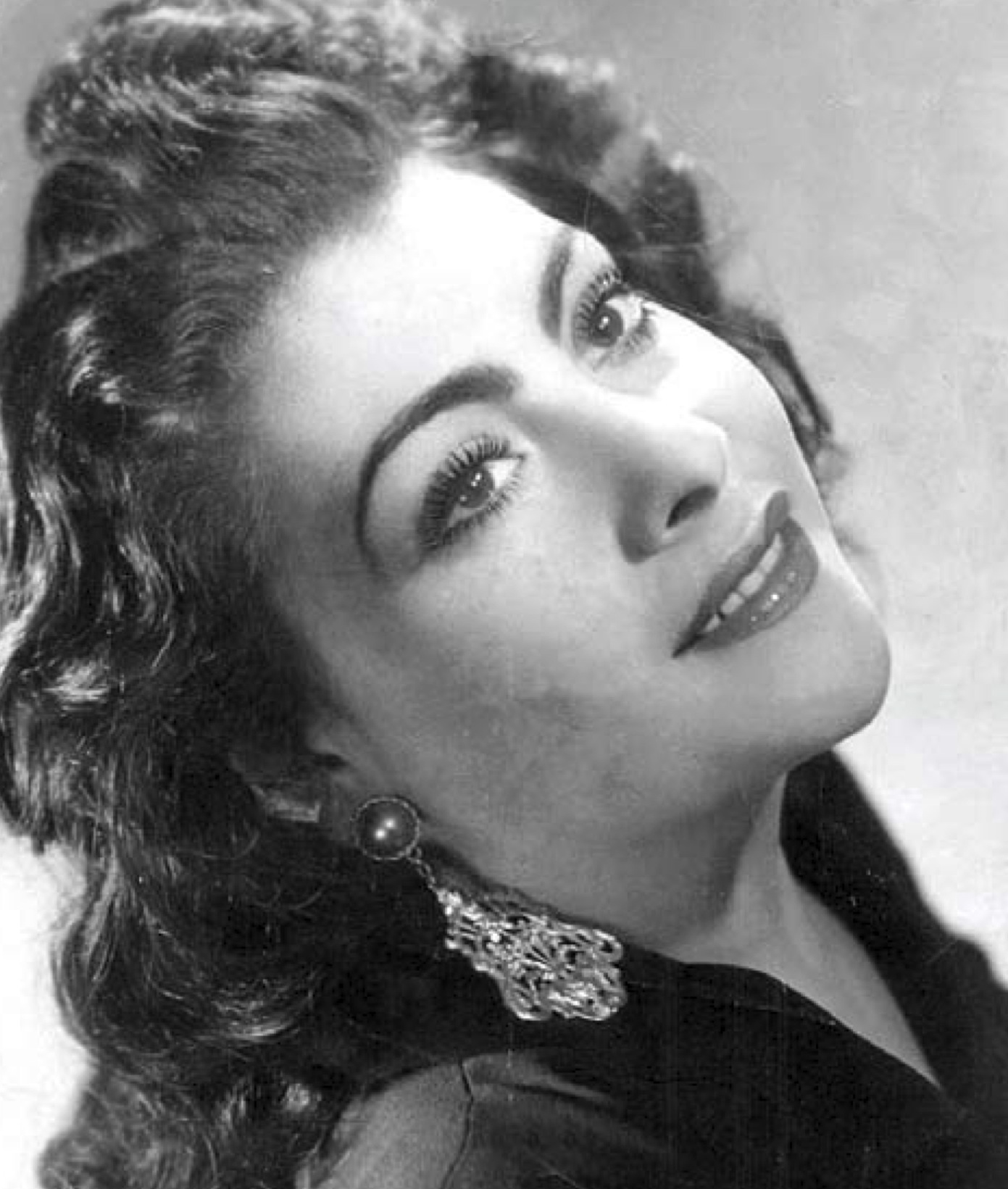
- Born: 1926; Algiers, French Algeria
- Died: 19 August 2003 (aged 76–77); Paris, France
- Other name: Leïla Fateh
- Occupation: Singer
- Years active: 1950s-1990s
- Known for: French and Franco-Arab chanson
- Notable work: Ana Laouliya-Oumi-Alger Alger

Line Monty, (Arabic: لين مونتي) born as Éliane Serfati, also known by her stage name Leïla Fateh (1926 – 19 August 2003), was a French-Algerian singer who sang in Arabic and French. She has been called "the grande dame of Judeo-Arabic music" and "a central figure in France's 'Oriental music' scene until the late 1990s."

== Life and career ==
Éliane Serfati grew up in a Jewish family in Algiers, the capital of French Algeria. A fan of Édith Piaf, she took singing lessons at the city's music school and appeared in charity events.

After moving to Paris in the early 1950s, she started to use the stage name Line Monty and appeared in music halls of the Quartier latin. Her 78 rpm. records were produced by Pathé Marconi Records. In these songs, as well as her other recordings of Algerian music, she was accompanied on the piano by Maurice El Médioni. One of her first successes in the hybrid style of the Franco-Arab chanson was "L’Orientale" (The Oriental), composed by Youssef Hagège that was covered a decade later by Enrico Macias.

In December 1952, she turned to singing French chansons with orchestras conducted by Raymond Legrand and André Popp, published by the same label until October 1956. Her career as an interpret of popular French songs took her to Germany, the Netherlands, the Middle-East, South America, Canada, and the United States, where she had a club in New York for ten years.

In 1962, Monty appeared at a festival for the heritage of Sephardic music alongside other Jewish-Algerian musicians Maurice el Médiouni, Lili Boniche and Reinette l'Oranaise at the Opéra-Comédie in Montpellier in the south of France.

A collection of her Algerian and Franco-Arab chansons was released as Trésors de la chanson Judéo-Arabe - Line Monty in the early 1990s and re-edited in the 2000s.

As well as her compatriot Reinette l'Oranaise, Line Monty was buried in the cemetery of Pantin in Paris.

== Awards and recognition ==
- Prix Edith Piaf and Prix d'Olympia.

== Reception ==
A 2014 book on contemporary youth culture, including the history of North African music and Jewish as well as Muslim identities, described Monty's stage performance and called her "the grande dame of Judeo-Arabic music" and "a central figure in France's 'Oriental music' scene until the late 1990s." In his memoir, her long-time pianist and composer Maurice El Mediouni remembered his musical collaboration with Line Monty.
