= Allalou =

Algerian playwright and theatre director

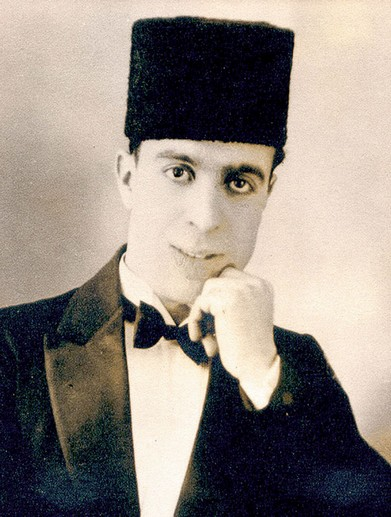
- Born: Ali Sellali; March 30, 1902; Algiers, Algeria
- Died: February 19, 1992 (aged 89); Algiers, Algeria
- Occupations: Playwright, singer

Allalou (March 30, 1902 – February 19, 1992) was an Algerian playwright, theatre director and actor known as the father of Algerian theater.

== Early life ==
Allalou was born Ali Sellali on March 3, 1902, in the Casbah of Algiers.

== Biography ==
Allalou who lost his father early began at the age of thirteen to work to support his family. He successively practiced jobs as pharmacy clerk, bookseller and tramway worker. His interest in the artistic representation manifested itself early. At the age of fifteen, he began frequenting the Foyer du soldat where he played skits and sang songs (he was a visionary and eccentric comic singer). playing "an everyday sort of fool". He precociously became familiar with drama. He attended galas and performances by Georges Abiad and Azzedine's Egyptian theatre companies in the early twenties. This encounter with theater gave him the idea to produce plays.

Allalou began to produce sketches which dealt with subjects drawn primarily from everyday life: marriage, divorce, alcoholism, including the innovative three-act play Djeha (1926), which he co-wrote with actor Brahim Dahmoune. Djeha is "widely recognized as the first play performed in Algerian Darija in a European-style theatrical setting". Similar themes were included in the plays staged after 1926. Contacts with European and especially Edmond Yafil, a great connoisseur of Algerian classical music who devoted his life to the development of this art, made Allalou understand and appreciate music.

Allalou retired from the stage in 1933 and "burned all his manuscripts". He died on February 19, 1992, in Algiers.

== Plays ==
- Djeha (1926)
- Zouadj Bou 'Akline (1926)
- One Thousand and One Nights (1930, 1931)

== Bibliography ==
- Sellali, Ali (2004) [1982]. L'aurore du théâtre algérien (1926-1930) (in French). Oran: Dar el Gharb. p. 119.
- Sellali, Ali (1986). De la musique andalouse au théâtre (in French). Paris: L'Internationale de l'imaginaire nº5.
