= Mohamed Iguerbouchène =

Algerian composer

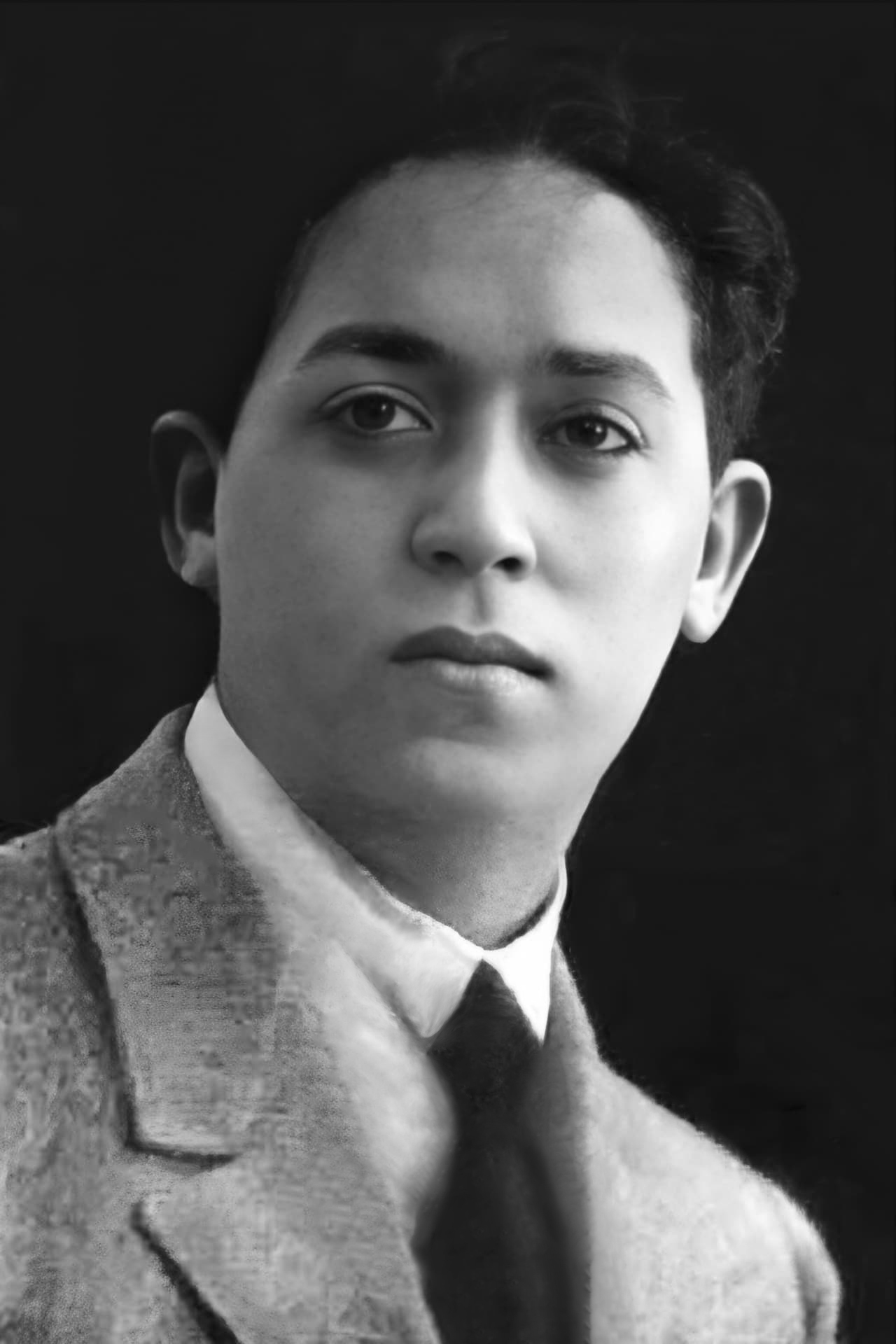
- Born: 13 November 1907; Aït-Ouchen, Algeria
- Died: 23 August 1966 (aged 58); Hydra, Algeria
- Occupations: Composer, musician, musicologist
- Writing career
- Pen name: Georges M. Iguerbouchen (Francophile name) Mohamed Ygerbuchen (as screen credited), Mohamed Ben Saïd Iquerbouchen
- Language: Kabyle, English, French

Mohamed Iguerbouchène; (Kabyle: Muḥand Igerbucen; 13 November 1907 – 23 August 1966) was an Algerian composer.

== Early life ==
Mohamed Iguerbouchène was the eldest of eleven children born to Saïd Ben Ali and Sik Fatma Bent Areski. He attended an English primary school in Algiers. It was there that he was spotted by Bernard Fraser Ross (born Bernard Fraser), a homosexual Scottish bachelor and wealthy heir who spent his winters in Algiers. Fraser Ross had previously served eight years in prison as a procurer for Lord Battersea and other aristocrats. Ross convinced Iguerbouchène's parents to let him take the boy to England to pursue a career in music.

== Training ==
Due to Fraser Ross's reputation, Iguerbouchène was likely privately educated. He later lied about his early years: claims that he studied at a Norton College, the Royal Academy of Music, the Royal College of Music, or even one of the predecessors of the Royal Northern College of Music, and under Robert Fischhof and Alfred Grünfeld have proven to be false. However, he was certainly a musical prodigy. Early works included Kabylia Rapsodie n. 9 and Arabic rapsodie n. 7.

== Inheritance and marriage ==
Following Fraser Ross's death in 1929, Iguerbouchène inherited all his Algerian property. The will also stipulated that he would receive a conditional bequest of 1,500 pounds if he did not marry a woman of European birth. Iguerbouchéne met Fraser Ross halfway by marrying Louise Gomez, a French citizen from Algeria. Although the marriage failed, they did not divorce.

== Early career ==
In 1934, Iguerbouchène was introduced to the Société des auteurs, compositeurs et éditeurs de musique (SACEM) as a songwriter, and in that same year he was also introduced as a member of the Société des Auteurs et Compositeurs Dramatiques (SACD). In France, at the école normale des langues orientales de Paris, he studied Tamahaq, Tachawit and Tashelhit.

In the early 1930s, Iguerbouchène composed the music for a number of Algerian documentaries and a short film (Dzair). This led to Julien Duvivier asking him to collaborate with Vincent Scottoon the soundtrack of the 1937 feature film Pépé le Moko starring Jean Gabin. He was credited as "Mohamed Ygerbuchen". The film was remade in 1938 in Hollywood as Algiers, and again used his music: this time he was credited as ‘Mohammed Igarbouchen’.

In the 1930s also Iguerbouchène became the co-proprietor of a bar-restaurant and cabaret, ‘El Djazaïr’ (‘Algiers’ in Arabic), on the rue de la Huchette in the Latin Quarter of Paris. In 1938, he met the singer Salim Halali in Paris (who was originally from Annaba), with whom he composed approximately fifty songs, mainly in an Arabic Flamenco style. The collaboration was successful in Parisian clubs, and they also toured the rest of Europe. They were in particularly popular in North Africa.

Following Iguerbouchène's approach to the BBC, in 1939 it broadcast one of his orchestral works, a 'Moorish Rhapsody', which was conducted by Charles Brill.

== Wartime years ==
During World War II, Iguerbouchène was a Nazi collaborator, managing the musical direction of the regime's Paris Mondial propaganda broadcasts targeting North Africa. He also began a relationship with a German-Belgian, Iwane 'Yvonne' Vom Dorp, with whom he had five illegitimate children. She would eventually leave him. He was not prosecuted for treason by the French government at the end of the war due to the protection of a high-ranking official.

== Later years ==
In early 1945, Iguerbouchène composed about 100 songs based on poems in Thousands Nights by Rabindranath Tagore. In 1946, he composed music for Les plongeurs du désert by Tahar Hannache. Iguerbouchène also composed for the 1962 French short Le songe de chevaux sauvages, directed by Albert Lamorisse about wild horses in France.

In 1957, Iguerbouchène returned to Algeria, where he worked for Algerian Radio and composed and conducted for the Algiers Opera Orchestra. Following the Algerian War of Independence and the subsequent official policy of arabisation, however, he found himself marginalised as someone who was strongly identified with France and also as a Kabyle. Embittered and ignored, he died of diabetes in obscurity in Algiers. Recent years have witnessed attempts to rehabilitate and revive his works, and forge him into a national icon.

== Bibliography ==
- Jordaan, Peter A Secret Between Gentlemen: Lord Battersea's hidden scandal and the lives it changed forever., Alchemie Books, 2022.
- Katz, Ethan B.The Burdens of Brotherhood: Jews and Muslims from North African to France, Harvard University Press, Harvard, 2015.
- Ounnoughene, Mouloud Mohamed Iguerbouchène: Un Oeuvre Intemporelle, Dar Khettab, Algiers, 2015.
