= Jeanne Faivre d'Arcier =

French novelist

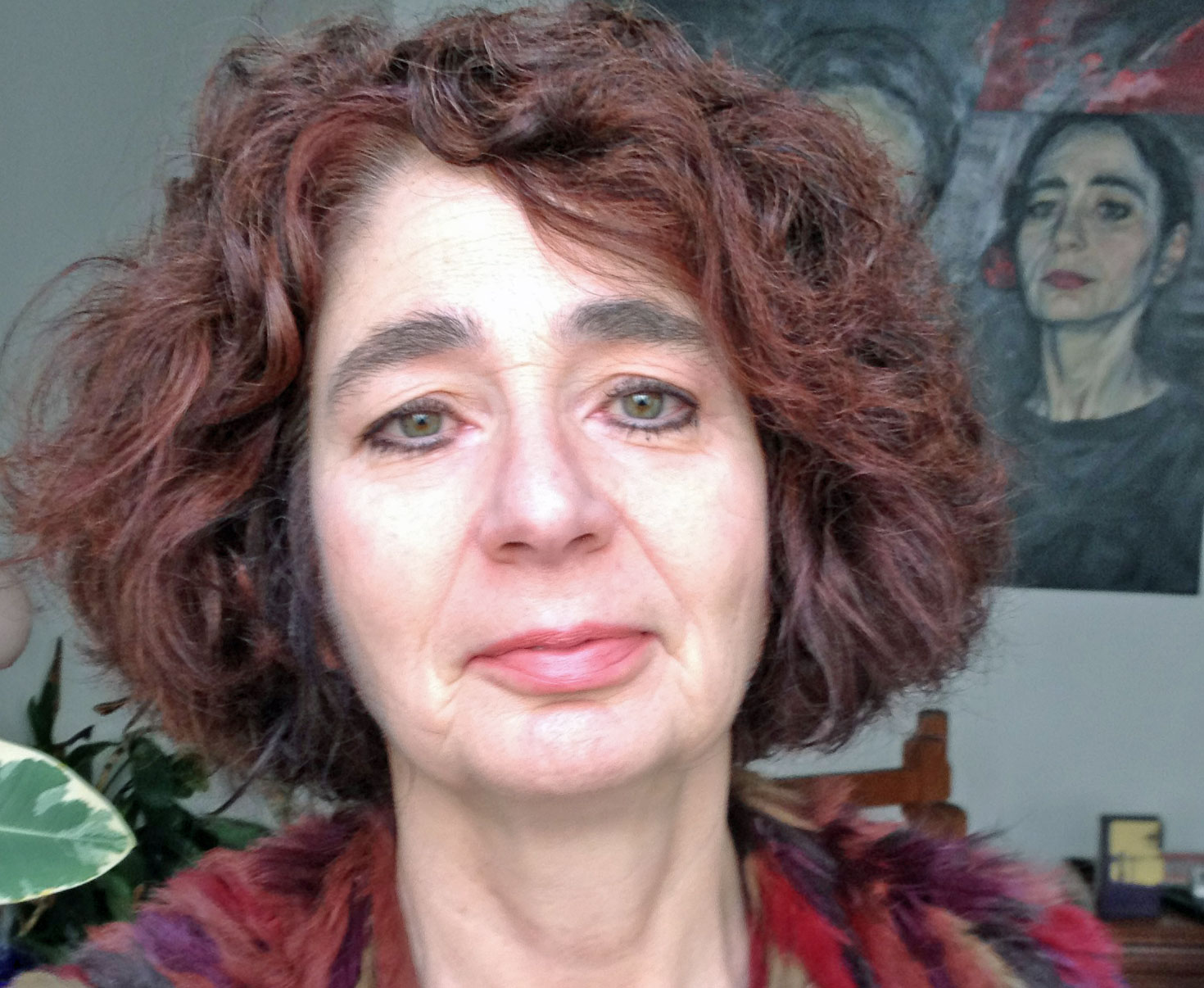
- Born: 31 August 1950; Paris, France
- Occupations: Novelist; Short-story writer
- Writing career
- Genres: Thrillers; Noir fiction; Fantasy
- Notable awards: Prix Ozone, 1998; Grand prix de l'Imaginaire, 2001

Jeanne Faivre d'Arcier (born 1950) is a French novelist, short-story writer and writer of children's stories.

== Early life ==
Jeanne Faivre d'Arcier was born on 31 August 1950 in Paris. She studied classics at the Paris Nanterre University and at the Institute of Political Studies in Paris. She is married, with no children. Her first novel, La Ceinture, was published in 1980, when she was 29, and is an autobiographical novel about anorexia.

== Career ==
Faivre d'Arcier's attempts to follow up La Ceinture were unsuccessful and she failed to get her novels published. She became a headhunter for the cosmetics and luxury goods industry and stopped writing. Later, she met a publisher, who would become both her companion and literary advisor. On his suggestion, she started to read thrillers by English-language authors, such as Stephen King, Peter Straub, and Graham Masterton, which inspired her to begin writing again. In 1993, she published a new novel: Rouge flamenco, biographie d'une vampire (Rouge flamenco, portrait of a vampire flamenco dancer) about a dancer who was transformed into a vampire in a brothel in Algiers. This became the first of a trilogy of novels on vampires, being followed by La Déesse écarlate (The Scarlet Goddess) in 1997, which was set in India, and Le Dernier Vampire (The Last Vampire) published in 2012, which takes place during the French Revolution. The trilogy is often compared to the work of the American Gothic fiction writer, Anne Rice.

Faivre d'Arcier has travelled widely in the Middle East, India and Southeast Asia, which are areas that have inspired her writing. Her stories have a recurring theme of sexual transgression. Habiba Messika, la brûlure du péché (Habiba Messika: The Burning of Sin), published in 1997, is a fictionalized biography of a Jewish singer and actress from Tunis burned alive by a lover she had rejected. In 2003 Faivre d'Arcier wrote a novel about Genghis Khan entitled Gengis Khan et le loup bleu.

Faivre d'Arcier has also written noir fiction, including L'ange blanc s'habille en noir (The White Angel wears black) in 2001, Les Yeux de cendre (The eyes of ashes) in 2006, and Les Passagers du roi de Rome (The passengers of the King of Rome) in 2009. In 2008, she retired from her work as a headhunter, and devoted herself to writing. She lives in Paris and in Cap Ferret, close to Bordeaux in the Gironde region of France. Recent novels and stories have been inspired by the Pigalle district of Paris and Arcachon Bay, of which Cap Ferret is a part. Faivre d'Arcier's novels for children between 9 and 12 also often draw inspiration from the Cap Ferret area. They include Tempête au Cap Ferret (Storm at Cap Ferret) and Nuit d'Angoisse à l'île aux Oiseaux (Night of Anguish at the Île aux Oiseaux). The stories are particularly popular with children from the area. Novels for teenagers, such as Le vampire de Bacalan, are also set in the Bordeaux area.

Faivre d'Arcier has also published numerous short stories that appear in various collections. She is a member of the Société des gens de lettres de France, the writers' association founded in 1838 by Honoré de Balzac, Victor Hugo, Alexandre Dumas, and George Sand. She is also a member of l'Association des amis de Chester Himes à Bordeaux et sur le basin (ACHAAB), an association of authors of thrillers who come from the south-west of France. Every September the association organizes the thriller festival, Polar en Cabanes, in Gujan Mestras in the Gironde.

== Awards ==
In 1998, Faivre d'Arcier won the Prix Ozone for La Déesse écarlate, the second part of her trilogy, which draws on Hindu mythology. Her short story, Monsieur Boum-Boum, published in the anthology Cosmica Erotica, won her the Grand prix de l'Imaginaire for French short stories in 2001. She received the short story prize at the Blaye literature festival in 2015 and the readers' prize for her entire œuvre at the thriller festival in Gujan Mestras in the same year.

== Publications ==
=== Novels ===
- La Ceinture. Flammarion. 1980. ISBN 978-2080642462. Under the name of Jeanne Rusca
- Rouge flamenco, biographie d'une vampire. Manya. 1993. ISBN 978-2878960785.
- La Déesse écarlate. fr: Pocket. 1997. ISBN 978-2266077064.
- Habiba Messika, la brûlure du péché. Belfond. 1997. ISBN 9782714435477.
- L'ange blanc s'habille en noir. L'Atalante. 2001. ISBN 284172168X.
- Gengis Khan et le loup bleu. L'Atalante. 2003. ISBN 2-84172-233-3.
- Les Yeux de cendre. fr: Le Cherche midi. 2006. ISBN 2749105587.
- Les Passagers du roi de Rome. fr: Éditions du Rocher. 2009. ISBN 978-2-268-06768-1.
- Le Dernier Vampire. fr: Bragelonne. 2012. ISBN 978-2-35294-545-1.
- L'Opéra macabre. Bragelonne. 2013. ISBN 978-2-35294-691-5.
- Chroniques du Cap Ferret et de l'autre côté de l'eau. fr: Vents Salés. 2015. ISBN 978-2-35452-121-9.
- Les Encombrant. Milady. 2017. ISBN 978-2-8112-0694-9.
- Meurtres sur Garonne - Cristal Noir. La Geste. 2021. ISBN 979-10-353-1026-4.

=== Books for young people ===
- La Belle et les Clochards. Syros. 2004. ISBN 978-2-74-850281-7.
- Nuit d'angoisse à l'île aux oiseaux. Syros. 2008. ISBN 978-2-74-850639-6.
- Traque sur la presqu'île. Syros. 2011. ISBN 978-2-74-851145-1.
- Le Secret des cabanes tchanquées. Syros. 2013. ISBN 978-2-7485-1423-0.
- Mystérieuse Disparition au banc d'Arguin. Syros. 2016. ISBN 978-2-74-852098-9.
- Le Vampire de Bacalan. Castelmore. 2016. ISBN 978-2-36231-189-5.
- Les Disparus du pont de pierre. Castelmore. 2017. ISBN 978-2-36231-323-3.
- Tempête au Cap Ferret. Syros. 2020. ISBN 978-2-74-852670-7.

=== Short stories ===
- Faustina. In De sang et d'encre, revue Naturellement. 1999. ISBN 2-910370-70-4.
- Monsieur Boum-Boum. Cosmic Erotica, fr: J'ai lu. 2000. ISBN 978-2290300657.
- L'Écume de l'espoir. In Utopiae 2001, fin de l'odyssée ?, L'Atalante. 2001. ISBN 2-84172-191-4.
- Yaksini. In Douces ou Cruelles, éditions Fleuve noir. 2001. ISBN 2-265-07158-7.
- N'oublie pas les nuits du Caire. In Momies, fr: Éditions de l'Oxymore. 2001. ISBN 2-913939-11-2.
- Maktaris Hôtel. In Bleu, Blanc, Sang, Fleuve noir. 2002. ISBN 978-2265072398.
- Sur le bitume. In Histoires à coucher dehors, fr: Éditions Julliard. 2003. ISBN 978-2-26-001646-5.
- L'Alchimie des soupirs. In Le sang des écrivains, éditions A Contrario. 2004. ISBN 978-2-75-340008-5.
- La Mouche bleue. In Baisers de sang, éditions fr: Les Belles Lettres. 2005. ISBN 2-251-49162-7.
- Le Miel et les Larmes. In Histoires d'Orient, éditions Sortilèges. 2005. ISBN 2-251-49163-5.
- Le Lémurien qui dansait des claquettes. In Lunatique, éditions fr: Eons, volume 72. 2006. ISBN 2-7544-0300-0.
- Les Trompettes de l'archange. In Fantômes du Jazz, éditions Les Belles Lettres. 2006. ISBN 2-251-49166-X.
