= Edmond Yafil =

Algerian composer, music impresario and scholar of Andalusi classical music

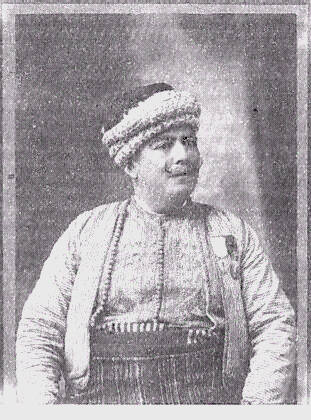
- Edmond Nathan Yafil

Background information
- Born: Edmond Nathan Yafil; 1874; Algiers, Algeria
- Died: October 1928 (aged 53–54) Algiers, Algeria
- Genre: Andalusian classical music (sanaa)
- Occupations: Singer, musician, writer
- Instrument: Vocals

Edmond Nathan Yafil (1874 – October 1928) was an Algerian composer, music impresario and scholar of Andalusi classical music.

== Biography ==
A native Algerian Jew born in Algiers in 1874, he was a French citizen, as the Crémieux Decree of 1870 had made Jewish Algerians citizens of French Algeria.

Yafil began, as other musicians of his time, by attending the Moorish cafés of the old Casbah of Algiers. Among other activities, these places perpetuated the tradition of sanaa music, a subgenre of the Andalusi classical music.

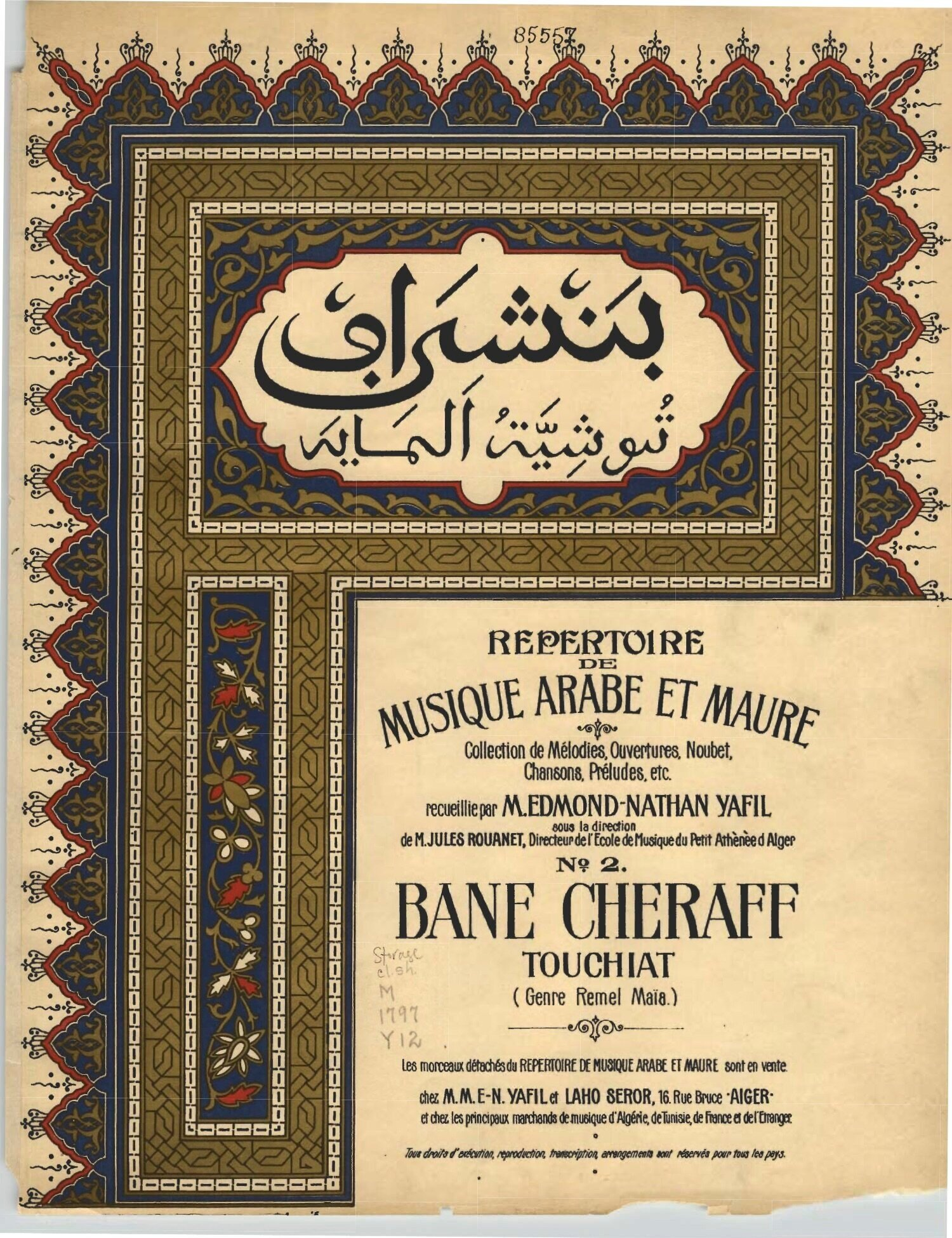
Page of Edmond Yafil's Repertoire de la musique musique arabe et maure

Researching and writing about Andalusi music, Yafil collaborated with musicethnologist Jules Rouanet and musician Cheikh Sfindja on the cataloging of this genre of music, and for the theater with Mahieddine Bachtarzi and Ali Sellali. His major contribution to the knowledge of Andalusi music was his Majmu‘ al-aghani wa-l-alḥan min kalam al-andalus ("Collection of Songs and Melodies from the Words of al-Andalus"), published in French under the supervision of Jules Rouanet as Répertoire de musique arabe et maure: Collection de mélodies, ouvertures, noubet, chansons, préludes, etc. in 1904.

As local agent and talent scout, Yafil also worked for Gramophone, Pathé, and Odéon record labels. He also was the founder of El Moutribia, Algeria’s first modern Andalusian orchestra and later taught as the first Chair of Arab music at the conservatory of Algiers.

Yafil is buried at the St. Eugene Cemetery in a suburb of Algiers.

== Works ==
=== In French ===
- Edmond Yafil, Répertoire de musique arabe et maure: collection de mélodies, ouvertures, noubet, chansons, préludes, etc. (1904)

=== In Arabic ===
- Majmūʻ al-aghāni w-al-alḥān min kalām al-andalus
- Majmūʻ zahw al-anīs al-mukhtaṣṣ bi-al-tabāsī wa-al-qawādis

== Reception ==
In his 2017 PhD thesis about North African music in the 20th-century, music historian Christopher Silver wrote that Yafil's "original Arabic-language publication retains its foundational status in Algeria and other parts of the Maghrib."
