= Samy Elmaghribi =

Jewish-Moroccan musician (1922-2008)

Samy Elmaghribi

Samy Elmaghribi (born Salomon Amzallag; 19 April 1922 – 9 March 2008) was a Moroccan Jewish musician. Born in Safi, he lived in Rabat, Salé, Paris, Montreal, and Ashdod. The Institut européen des musiques juives describes his work as combining "popular Moroccan songs, ancient and modern, classical Andalusian singing, and liturgical chanting, to which he integrated melodies from Turkey and Central Europe."

== Early life and education ==
He was the youngest of three sons of Farha and Amram Amzallag. His family moved from Safi to the Moroccan capital Rabat in 1926, when he was 14 years old (around 1936). Shortly after his mother's death they moved to nearby Salé. In Rabat, he studied at the Alliance Israelite and started to familiarize himself with Arab-Andalusian music. He taught himself to play the oud and also sang in the synagogue. Later he perfected his technique by attending the music academy in Casablanca.

== Career ==
Elmaghribi was 20 years old, when he decided to quit his position as a sales manager to devote himself entirely to music. Having access to the Moroccan royal palace, he was one of the preferred singers of crown prince Hassan and king Mohammed V.

In 1955 in Casablanca, Elmaghribi established his own record label, Samyphone. The discs were originally pressed in France. In the beginning of the 1960s, the Israeli record label Zakiphon, which specialized in the music of Maghrebi Jews, pressed and distributed Samyphone albums in Israel. In the late 1960s, Pathé reissued several Samyphone albums from the 1950s for the French market.

Elmaghribi left Morocco for Montreal in 1960. In 1967, he became the first cantor of Shearith Israel, the Spanish and Portuguese Synagogue of Montreal. He officiated there for 16 years. In 1984 he moved again, to Ashdod in Israel, where he established a Sephardic music center Merkaz Piyyout Veshira. From 1988 to 1994, Elmaghribi served there as music director and led a student choir that developed into the Israeli Andalusian Orchestra.

Elmaghribi returned to Montreal in 1996, though he continued to travel and perform internationally. At some point in the last decade of his life he served as cantor at Beit Yosef Sephardi synagogue of New Jersey, and taught Sephardi liturgy at Yeshiva University in New York. He died on March 9, 2008, in Montreal.

Chaimae Bouazzaoui, the first Moroccan woman diplomat in Israel, interviewed Samy Elmaghribi's daughter Yolland Amzallag in 2015 on the launch of the Samy Elmaghribi Foundation in Canada, where she described her father as "the Moroccan Aznavour".

== Discography ==
Contributing artist

- The Rough Guide to the Music of Morocco (2012, World Music Network)

== Reception ==
In his book Recording History: Jews, Muslims, and Music across Twentieth-Century North Africa, music historian Christopher Silver wrote that musicians such as Salim Halali, Samy Elmaghribi, Louisa Tounsia and Lili Labassi were some of the "most audible and influential cultural figures of an era of profound change and critical importance", as Morocco, Algeria and Tunisia were initiating their respective political future after the end of French colonial rule. As Silver added, "The records of these and other artists set the tone for the period in question.
