= Canadian Jewish Studies =

Academic journal of Canadian Jewish studies

- Discipline: Jewish studies, Canadian studies
- Language: English, French
- Edited by: David S. Koffman

Publication details
- History: 1993-present
- Publisher: Association for Canadian Jewish Studies (Canada)
- Frequency: Biannual
- Open access: Yes

Standard abbreviations
- ISO 4: Can. Jew. Stud.

Indexing
- ISSN: 1198-3493
- OCLC no.: 187060890

Links
- Journal homepage; Current issue

Canadian Jewish Studies is a peer-reviewed academic journal and an official publication of the Association for Canadian Jewish Studies.

Established in 1993, the journal covers research on all aspects of the Canadian Jewish experience. The journal was published annually from 1993 to 2019. It has appeared biannually since 2019. It is open access and features contributions in both of Canada's official languages, English and French.

In addition to peer-reviewed articles and book reviews, the journal publishes several regular sub-sections:

- "The Archives Matter" features contributions by researchers and archivists reflecting on the use of Jewish and non-Jewish archival sources for the study of Canadian Jewish life.
- "Reflections" includes essays by scholars on their careers in the field of Canadian Jewish Studies. Contributors include the sociologists Robert Brym (University of Toronto) and Morton Weinfeld (McGill University), as well as the historians Pierre Anctil (University of Ottawa), Ira Robinson (Concordia University), and Harold Troper (University of Toronto)
- "Translation" presents annotated English- or French-language translations of texts originally composed in other languages and relevant to the Canadian Jewish experience. Texts have been translated from Yiddish, Hebrew, Russian, German, and Turkish.
- "Roundtable" gathers scholars and practitioners in conversation about a theme or subject relevant to the field of Canadian Jewish Studies.

The editor-in-chief is David S. Koffman (York University).
