= Messaoud El Mediouni =

Algerian musician

Messaoud El Medioni (25 November 1886 in Oran - 23 March 1943), also known as Saoud l'Oranais, was an Algerian band leader and proprietor of the original Café Oran. He was the uncle of Algerian pianist Maurice El Mediouni.

Around 1938, the mother of a 13-year-old blind girl from Tiaret, Sultana Daoud, sent her to study with "Saoud l'Oranais" - this girl was later to become famous as Reinette L'Oranaise, the most prominent of all Jewish Algerian singers.

Medioni was arrested by the Germans in Marseille in January 1943 and sent to Sobibor extermination camp, where he was murdered in the gas chambers on 23 March 1943.
