= Rainer Lotz =

German discographer (born 1937)

- Born: 1937 (age 88–89); Hamburg, Germany
- Occupations: Discographer, jazz historian, economist and political scientist

Erich Rainer Lotz (born 1937, Hamburg) is a German discographer and jazz historian, as well as an economist and political scientist specializing in development policy. He is the author of several publications on historical recordings, radio history, ragtime, and jazz. In 2014, he received a nomination for a Grammy Award for Best Historical Album for the CD box set Black Europe, for which he co-authored.

Lotz is the editor of the German National Discography, which chronicles recordings made in Germany during the shellac era (78 rpm records, circa 1890 to 1960). The discography is published in the series Vocal Recordings (Operas, Songs), Cabaret, Dance Music, Speech Recordings, and Judaica. His discographies are published by Birgit Lotz Verlag, Bonn, and Greenwood Press. Lotz has researched the work and recording history of Black musicians in Europe. He has also researched jazz propaganda band, "Charlie and his Orchestra," which performed with English lyrics on behalf of the Reich Propaganda Ministry during the Third Reich.

He has written for Doctor Jazz, Storyville, Der Jazzfreund, Banjo Podium, Hot Jazz Info, Fox auf 78 (column "Von Nadeln und Dosen"), Der Schalltrichter, "Schall und Rauch," the "Black Music Research Journal," "78 Quarterly," "International Discographer," "IASA Journal," and "ARSC Journal."

Lotz received a doctorate in economics and political science in 1965 at Karlsruhe. His dissertation focused on comparative costs in developing countries, and he subsequently worked in development aid for the German Federal Ministry for Economic Cooperation and Development (BMZ). Lotz was awarded an honorary doctorate from the Franz Liszt Academy of Music in Weimar in 2020. In 2025, he was awarded the Federal Cross of Merit.

Part of his collection of over 60,000 shellac records went to the Library of Congress in 2009, with other parts at the German National Archive of Literature.

== Life ==
Lotz is the son of the poet and literary critic Erich Adolf Lotz. His siblings are the gallery owner and artist Helga Brehm, the plasma physicist Wolfgang Lotz, and the bank director Erik-Ulf Lotz. He is the father of the jazz flutist, composer, and music promoter Mark Alban Lotz.

== Awards ==
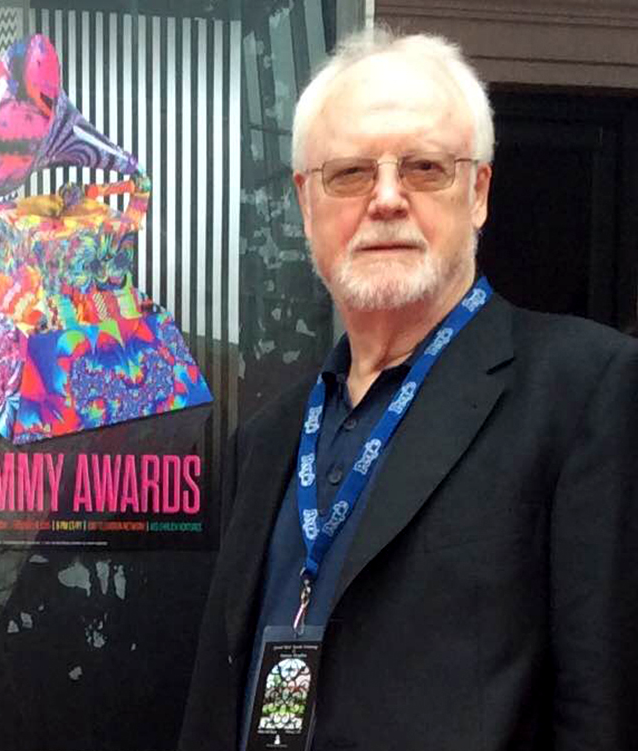
Rainer E Lotz - 2015 - Ebell Theatre in Los Angeles - Grammy Nomination

- 1998 - ARSC (Association of Recorded Sound Collections) Lifetime Achievement Award.
- 2014 - Nomination - Grammy Award for Best Historical Album for the CD box set Black Europe, (co-author).
- 2017 - IASA (International Association of Sound and Audiovisual Archives) Special Recognition Award.
- 2018 - Honorary Badge of the Society for Historical Sound Recordings, Vienna.
- 2018 - Honorary Membership of the German/Swiss Group of IASA.
- 2019 - Shanghai Conference on Sound Recording in Honour of the 80th Birthday of Rainer E. Lotz.
- 2020 - Honorary Doctorate from the Hochschule für Musik Franz Liszt in Weimar.
- 2025 - Verdienstkreuz am Bande des Verdienstordens der Bundesrepublik Deutschland (Order of Merit of the Federal Republic of Germany).

== Works ==
- Das Heckscher/Ohlin-Theorem – Darstellung der Theorie und Untersuchung der praktischen Relevanz für die Investitionspolitik in Entwicklungsländern. Dissertation: Karlsruhe, 1965
- Grammophonplatten aus der Ragtime-Ära. Bibliophile Taschenbücher Nr.141. Dortmund: Harenberg 1979, ISBN 978-3-88379-141-8
- Hot Dance Bands in Germany – A Photo Album (2 Volumes), Menden: Jazzfreund-Publikation Nr.21, 1982
- with Neuert: The AFRS (Armed Forces Radio Service) Jubilee Show - A Discography (2 Volumes), Frankfurt/Main: Ruecker, 1985 ISBN 3-923397-01-1
- Michael Danzi. American Musician in Germany 1924-1939, as told to Rainer E. Lotz. Schmitten: Rücker 1986 ISBN 3-923397-02-X
- Vivienda popular y ayuda mutua. Cooperación para mejorar la situación habitacional de los países en desarrollo. Bonn: BMZ 1988, ISBN 3-88085-387-8
- with Pegg (Hrsg.): Under the Imperial Carpet – Essays in black history 1780-1950. Crawley: Rabbit Press, 1986 ISBN 0-948775-01-7
- German Ragtime And Prehistory Of Jazz – Volume 1: The Sound Documents. Chigwell: Storyville 1985 ISBN 0-902391-08-9
- Amerikaner in Europa, im Ausstellungskatalog Thats Jazz (Wolber Hrsg.). Darmstadt 1988 ISBN 3-92363-987-2
- with Heier: The Banjo on Record – a Bio-Discography. Westport: Greenwood Press 1993 ISBN 0-313-28492-X
- Deutsche National-Discographie (Hrsg.), Bonn: Birgit Lotz Verlag, 1991 bis 2007, 24 volumes ISBN 3-9802656-6-8 ff
- with Bastin, Green, Rye: Black People, Entertainers of African descent in Germany and Europe. Bonn: Birgit Lotz Verlag 1997, with 1 CD ISBN 3-9803461-8-8
- mit Lührs, et.al., Energie in der deutschen Entwicklungszusammenarbeit, Bonn: BMZ Materialien Nr.69, 1997
- with Bergmeier, Hitlers Airwaves – the Inside Story of Nazi Radio Broadcasting and Propaganda Swing. Yale University Press 1997, with 1 CD ISBN 0-300-06709-7
- with Willinghofer et.al., Überlebensfrage Wasser – eine Ressource wird knapp. Bonn: BMZ-Materialien Nr.94, 19982 ISBN 3-92334-318-3
- with Bergmeier, Eisler Vorbei – Dokumentation jüdischen Musiklebens in Berlin 1933-1938/Beyond Recall – Documentation of Jewish Musical Life in Nazi Berloin 1933-1938. Hambergen: Bear Family 2001 , with 11 CDs and 1 DVD ISBN 3-89795-825-2
- with Bergmeier, Live from the Cotton Club. Bear Family 2003, mit 2 CDs ISBN 3-89916-013-4
- with Bergmeier, Kühn: Lili Marleen an allen Fronten – ein Lied geht um die Welt. Hambergen: Bear Family 2005, with 7 CDs ISBN 3-89916-154-8
- Black Music Prior to the First World War – American Origins and German Perspectives, in: Neil Wynn(ed.) Cross the Water Blues – African American Music in Europe. University Press of Mississippi 2007 ISBN 978-1-57806-960-6
- Deutsche Hot-Discographie. Cake Walk, Ragtime, Hot Dance & Jazz – ein Handbuch, Lotz Verlag 2006, with 1 CD ISBN 3-9810248-1-8
- with Bergmeier, Jazz in Deutschland. Hambergen: Bear Family 2008 with 8 CDs, ISBN 978-3-89916-379-7
- with Green & Rye, Black Europe – The sounds and images of black people in Europe pre-1927. Holste-Oldendorf: Bear Family 2013 (3 volumes) with 44 CDs EAN 5-397102-160950
- with Gunrem, Puille: Das Bilderlexikon der deutschen Schellack-Schallplatten: The German record label book. (5 Volumes.) Holste: Bear-Family-Records 2019 ISBN 978-3-89916-707-8.
