= Alice Fitoussi =

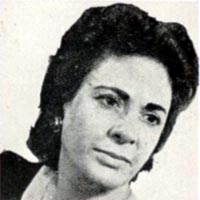

Background information
- Born: May 9, 1916; Bordj Bou Arréridj, Algeria
- Died: May 1978 (aged 61–62) El Biar, Algeria
- Genres: Andalusian classical music, hawzii
- Occupations: Singer and oud player
- Labels: Gramophone Records and Polyphon

Alice Fitoussi (May 9, 1916 – 1978) was an Algerian singer and musician, born in Bordj Bou Arréridj, French Algeria. She is known for her songs in the Andalusian and hawzii style during Algeria's pre-independence period.

== Life and career ==
Fitoussi was the daughter of Rahmim Fitoussi, an Algerian Jewish singer and violinist, and she learned her craft from him. She released her first record at the age of thirteen.

During the early twentieth century in Algeria and the Maghreb region, music was a multicultural affair, with Jewish and Muslim musicians sharing a long musical history. Women were increasingly present in this musical community but were often seen as not acceptable by conservative parts of the Muslim population. Jewish women like Fitoussi and her peers, such as Reinette L'Oranaise, were not subject to as much gender-based discrimination as Muslim female singers at the time.

Fitoussi often performed with Muslim musicians and for Muslim compatriots. Responding to conservative Muslim attitudes, she employed an all-female accompanying orchestra when performing for Muslim women, and performed only with males when the audience consisted of Muslim men. Notably, she is said to have been the only Jewish singer of the period who performed Medh, poetic songs in honor of the Prophet Mohammed for a Muslim audience. After independence in 1962, Fitoussi was one of the few Algerian Jewish musicians who continued to live in Algeria.

In 2006, some of her recordings were re-released as part of the Trésors de la Chanson Judéo-Arabe (Treasures of Jewish-Arab song) series from Mélodie Distribution.
