= Leïla Sfez =

Jewish Tunisian singer and composer

- Born: 1874
- Died: 1944 (aged 69–70)
- Other name: ليلى سفاز
- Occupations: singer, composer

Leïla Sfez (Arabic: ليلى سفاز) (born 1874–1944) was a Jewish Tunisian singer and composer who became a celebrated café-concert performer in Tunis in the 1920s. She sang music in both the ma'luf and charqui genres.

== Biography ==
Born into a Jewish Tunisian family in 1874, Leïla Sfez became a celebrated performer, singing songs in the classical Andalusian style in a concert hall in the Bab Souika district of Tunis. In addition to her performances of established music, she went on to compose songs herself. She is also remembered for introducing her niece Habiba Msika to her style of music. She taught her to sing and to play the piano.

Sfez's music was first recorded in 1910 by the Gramophone Company which had begun recording Jewish women vocalists in Tunisia. Their catalogue features Sfez performing ma'luf and Middle Eastern songs. In 1929, Pathé-Marconi recorded her songs, including "Hbibi ghab", "Jani el marsoul" et "Emta narja fik".

As time went by, the Chemmâma Sisters became increasingly popular, Sfez withdrew from the stage, devoting more and time to training her niece Habiba Msika who also gained popularity. Other popular Tunisian Jewish singers of the period included Banat Chamama and Cheikh El Afrit.
