= Habiba Msika =

Tunisian singer and actress (1903–1930)

- حبيبة مسيكة
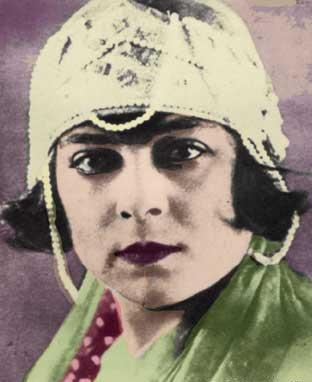
- Born: Marguerite Messika; 1903; Hafsiya Jewish quarter of Tunis
- Died: 21 February 1930 (aged 26–27); Tunis
- Citizenship: French protectorate of Tunisia
- Occupations: Singer, actress and dancer
- Years active: 1920s-1930
- Known for: popular Arabic songs, appearance in Tunisian and European theatre
- Notable work: Around 100 recordings of Arabic music from the 1920s
- Relatives: Leila Sfez, (aunt)

Habiba Msika, also spelled Messika (Arabic: حبيبة مسيكة; 1903 – February 21, 1930), was a Tunisian singer, dancer and actress. Born Marguerite Msika in the capital of the French Protectorate of Tunisia, she was the niece of the singer Leïla Sfez. In a study of 2018, she was called North Africa’s first superstar.

Msika quickly climbed the ladder of fame under the pseudonym Habiba ("beloved"). Prototype of the free modern woman, and master of her destiny, charismatic singer and daring actress, adored by her Tunisian fans, Msika was a social phenomenon in her time. The 1995 film The Fire Dance by Salma Baccar interpreted the last years of her career.

== Life ==
=== Early life ===
Msika was born in the Hara Jewish quarter of the historical part of Tunis in a working-class family. (Note: Msika's birth year is given in the entries of the French National Library and the Centre of Arab and Mediterranean Music as 1893, but most other reference works cited in this article state 1903. Further, her gravestone pictured in this article carries the inscription that she died at age 27.) Her father Daida and paternal uncle Khailoo Esseghir were musicians. Supported by her aunt Leila Sfez, she took lessons for singing, oud, piano and Ma'luf, a subgenre of Andalusian classical music with the famous composer Khemaïs Tarnane and Egyptian tenor Hassan Bannan. At the age of 15, she married her cousin Victor Chetboun, but their union lasted only a short time. Her first recital was held at the palace of La Marsa, where she met her lover, a minister of the Tunisian government.

=== Career ===
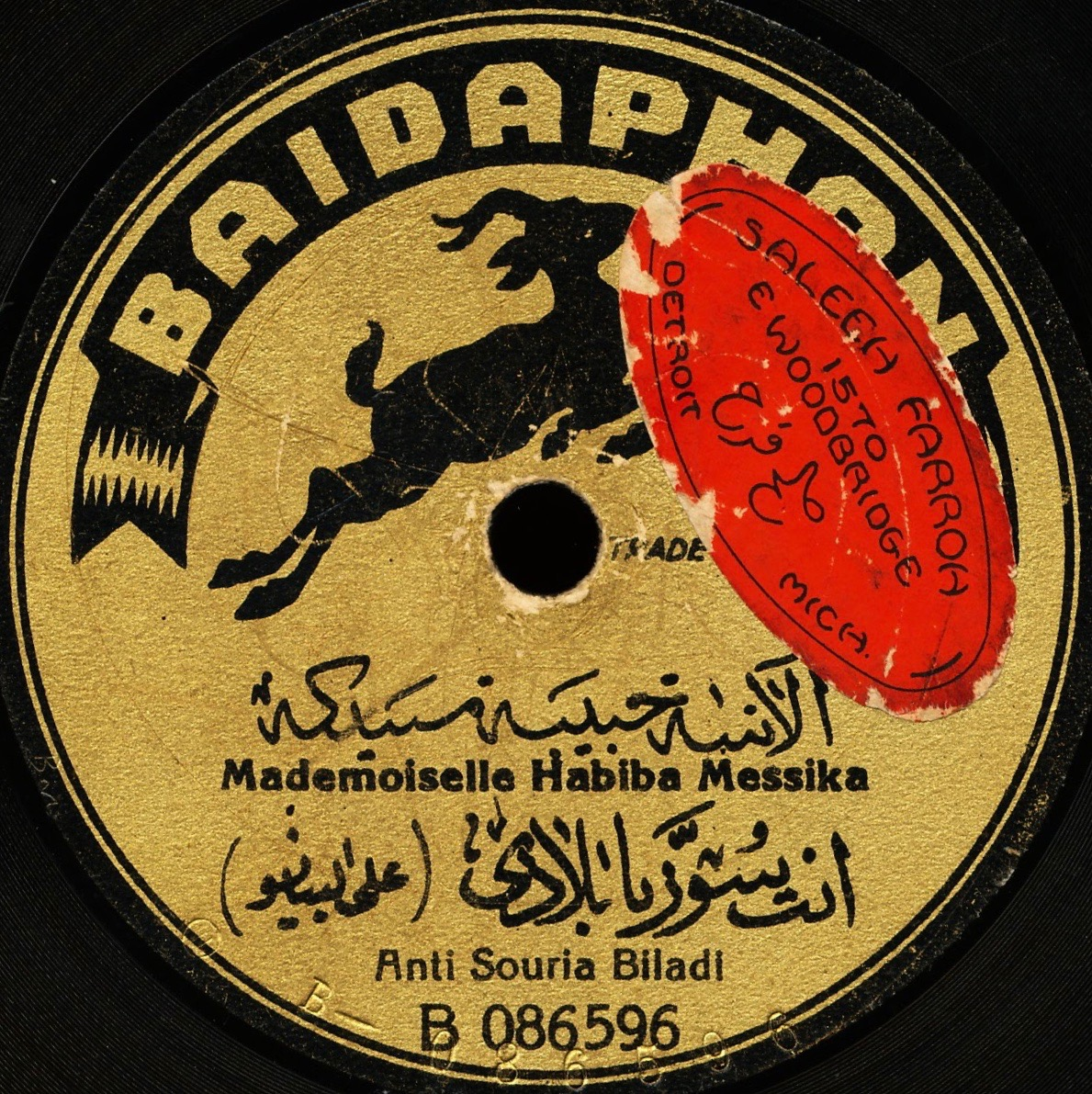
Record label for Habiba Messika's song "Anti Souria biladi" (You, Syria, are my country), 1928

During the late 1920s, Tunisian society saw major changes in social and cultural ways. In this early period of modern Tunisia, some Tunisian women learned French and the book by Tahar El Haddad Notre femme dans la societé et la religion (Our woman in society and religion) proposed major reforms.

Msika started singing at wedding parties and is said to have been the first Tunisian singer who interpreted songs by popular Egyptian musicians Umm Kulthum and Mohammed Abdel Wahab. Msika became a star in the country's cultural life and was admired by the "Soldiers of the Night", a nickname for her fans, mostly young dandies of Tunisia. Reportedly, these included Habib Bourguiba, who in 1957 became the first president of independent Tunisia. By the age of 21, she had established herself as a successful stage actress and was described by contemporaries as the "Second Sarah Bernhardt." On a journey with her lover to Paris, she met Pablo Picasso and Coco Chanel.

In the theatre company of Mohamed Bourguiba, the elder brother of the later Tunisian president, she performed in Arabic adaptations of plays by Shakespeare, Molière, and Victor Hugo. As she was also playing male roles, she was strongly criticised by conservative Tunisians. Her kiss for Juliet on stage in the role of Romeo at the Ben Kamla theatre in 1925 caused strong criticism. One evening in 1928, she was arrested by the French colonial authorities after having chanted slogans for independence on stage, wrapped in a Tunisian flag. In Europe, she performed in French with her theatre troupe in Paris, Nice, Monte Carlo, Biarritz, and Berlin. Through money she received from her admirers and her own artistic fees, she became financially independent.

Between 1924 and 1930, Msika recorded nearly 100 phonograph records for the Pathé, Gramophone, and Baidaphon labels. In 1925 a portrait of Messika adorned the cover of Pathé's Tunisian record catalogue. According to music historian Christopher Silver, this was the first time a record label in the Maghreb promoted an artist's photograph to market their recordings. Msika's recordings achieved wide popularity across Tunisia, Algeria, and Morocco and were among the best-selling records in the Maghreb since the start of the recording industry. Unusually, Msika was among the first North African performers who secured contracts with more than one record label at the same time. Unlike many of her contemporaries, who received only a one-time payment for recording sessions, she managed to negotiate royalty payments for every record.

After a concert tour in neighbouring Algeria, the Tunisian newspaper Le Petit Matin wrote: ‘"More than 1,500 people applauded the return of our talented and incomparable Tunisian star, Mademoiselle Habiba Messika." Besides songs with morally suggestive titles, including "Ala sirir el nom" ("On My Bed"), she also recorded patriotic marches dedicated to King Fuad of Egypt, King Faisal of Iraq and Muhammad VI Bey of Tunis, as well as songs praising Egypt and Syria. According to a intelligence report by French authorities, these recordings had the potential to "provoke unrest in the Muslim milieu."

=== Death ===
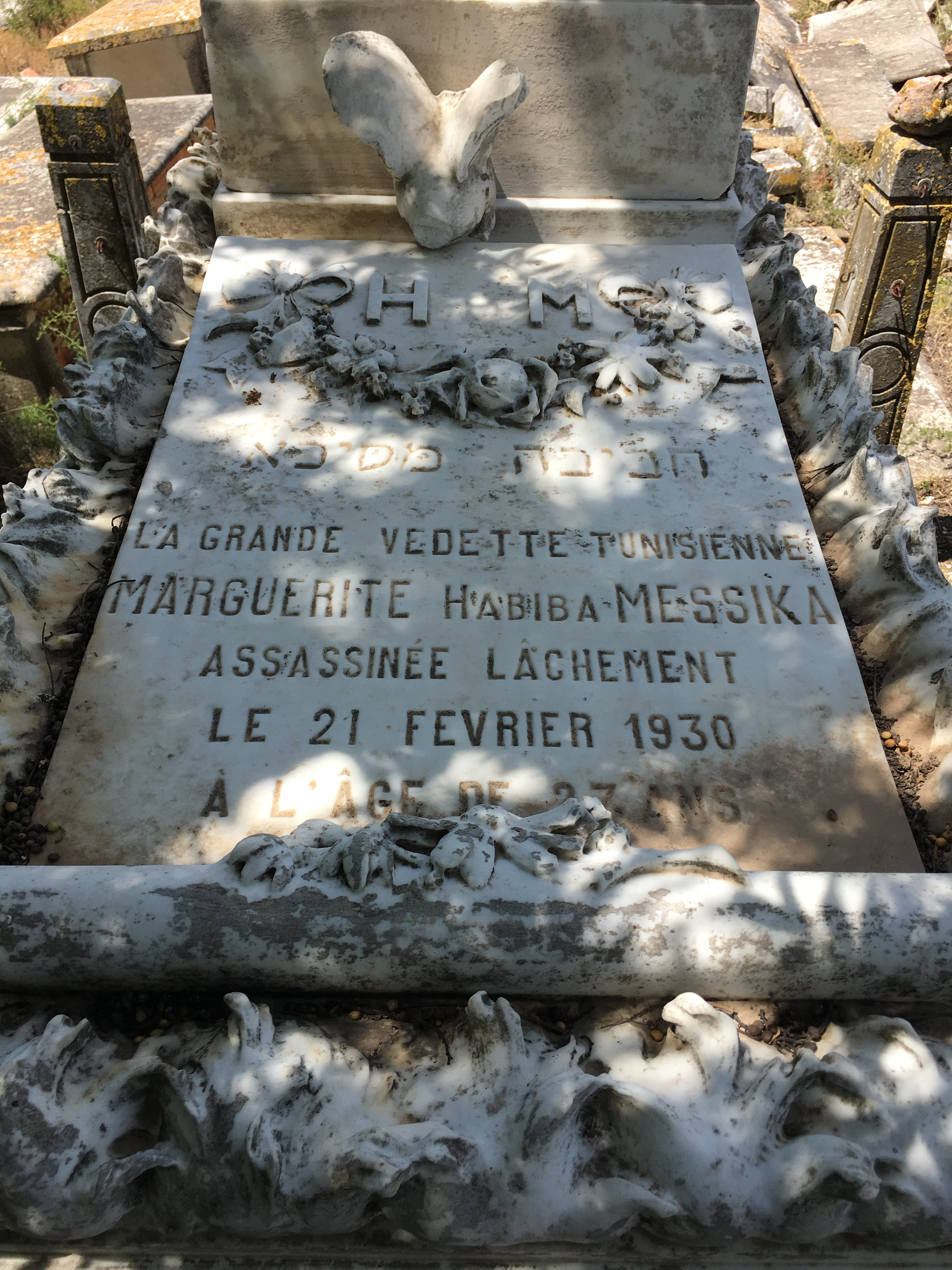
Tomb of the "grande vedette tunisienne" at the Borgel cemetery in Tunis

On the morning of 20 February, 1930, an obsessive older suitor named Eliyahu Mimouni entered her apartment in Alfred Durand-Claye Street in Tunis and set her on fire. Badly burned, she died the next day, followed soon after by Mimouni. Msika was buried in the Borgel cemetery of Tunis. Her funeral was accompanied by thousands of people on the Avenue de Londres, the main boulevard leading to the Jewish neighbourhood of Tunis. In the week after her death, a newsreel about her funeral was shown in Tunisian cinemas.

== Reception ==
Msika's life and career have been discussed in international scholarly studies and newsmedia, as well as in biographical movies. In her 1995 drama film La Danse du feu (The Fire Dance) Tunisian filmmaker Selma Baccar interpreted Msika during her last three years as "an artist who exceeds her own limits and the limits of society." In 2012, the documentary film Ciao Habiba! was directed by Sarah Benillouche. In 1997 French writer Jeanne Faivre d’Arcier published her biographical novel Habiba Messika: la brûlure du péché (Habiba Messika: The Burning of the Sin). It was described as an attempt to rehabilitate Msika, "whose role in the cultural history of Tunisia is still largely unknown." French-Tunisian historian Sophie Bessis retold Msika's life in her 2017 non-fiction book about five courageaous women in the history of Tunisia.

In 2016, the Foundation Femmes et Memoire paid tribute to Msika and other women pioneers of Tunisian theatre and song by celebrating 'Pioneers of Tunisia' day. More than 50 original records of Msika have been archived by the Centre of Arab and Mediterranean Music in Tunisia and a smaller number by the National Library of France. In the 21st century some of Msika's historical recordings were reissued as remastered versions.

The study Jewish-Muslim Interactions: Performing Cultures Between North Africa and France discussed Msika's recordings of nationalist North Aftican titles such as "Baladi ya Baladi" (My Country, O My Country) (Note: A digitized audio version of this recording is available at the French Gallica website.) and the Egyptian national anthem of the time in a transnational political context. Suspected of stirring up Arab nationalist feelings, these were censored by French colonial authorities in Morocco even after her death. Music historian Christopher Silver discussed Msika's recording sessions in his PhD thesis and in a biographical article calling her "North Africa’s first superstar." According to this article, Msika's recordings of pan-Arabist songs were found with members of the Destour, the nationalist party in the French protectorate of Tunisia. Further, Silver commented:

Habiba Messika’s story is that of an Arabic-singing Jewish star, as comfortable in her blended identity as her mixed audiences of Jews and Muslims. Her legacy is that of an interwar Tunisian nationalist who was equally at ease playing the role of Romeo on stage as she was dressing as a flapper off it.

— Chris Silver, The Life and Death of North Africa’s First Superstar,
