= Salim Halali =

Algerian singer (1920–2005)

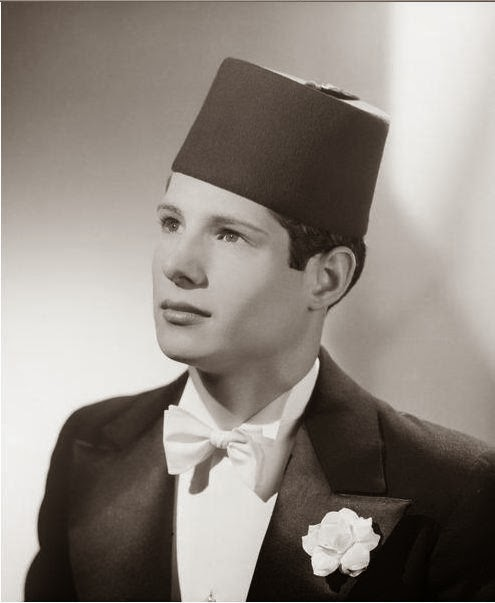
- Halali c. 1930s

Background information
- Born: Simon Halali; 30 July 1920; Annaba, French Algeria
- Died: 25 June 2005 (aged 84) Antibes, Alpes-Maritimes, France
- Genres: Middle of the road; Algerian; Andalusian; flamenco
- Occupation: Singer
- Instruments: Darbouka, Oud

Salim Halali (or Hilali; Arabic: سليم الهلالي; born Simon Halali; 30 July 1920 – 25 June 2005) was an Algerian singer who performed Algerian music and Arabic Andalusian classical music. He was a popular singer rather than a professional performer of traditional Arab-Andalusian music, in which he had no formal training.

Many of his songs remain popular in North Africa and among Jewish and Muslim North African communities in France, where he is "an iconic figure of French-Arab cabaret music."

== Early life ==
Salim Halali was born on 30 July 1920, in Bône, which is now known by its historic name, Annaba (Arabic: عنّابة), to a family originally from Souk Ahras. His father was of Turkish origin and his mother was of Judeo-Berber origin.

== Career ==
Halali stowed away on a ship bound for Marseille in 1934 and reached Paris in 1937 where he became successful as a singer in Parisian flamenco clubs, and met the Algierian music hall artist Mohamed el Kamel, who wrote Halali's first songs, including "Andaloussia", "Sevillane", "Taali", "Ardjaâ lebladek", "Bine el barah el youm wa", "Mounira" (the name of one of his sisters), "Nadira", "Ouchq el saheb", and "El qelb chahik". In later years, Mohand Iguerbouchène composed fifty songs for him. In 1938, Halali toured Europe and his flamenco records in Arabic became successful in North Africa. Among his other successes are "Al ain zarga" (The Blue Eyes), "Mahenni zine" (The beauty disturbed me), "Habibti samra" (My beloved has dark skin) and "Allala illali".

During the German occupation of France, Si Kaddour Benghabrit, the founder and first rector of the Great Mosque of Paris, managed to hide Halali's Jewish roots by providing him with a false birth certificate as a Muslim and etching the name of his late father on a tombstone at an unmarked grave in a Muslim cemetery Bobigny (Seine-Saint-Denis). Halali used to perform at the mosque's Moorish café alongside such artists as Ali Sriti and Ibrahim Salah. After the war, he renewed his successful performing career and earned the admiration of the Egyptian diva Umm Kulthum.

In 1947, Halali created a Middle Eastern cabaret, Folies Ismailia, in a Paris hotel that belonged to Ferdinand de Lesseps, located on the Avenue Montaigne in one of the city's best neighborhoods. In 1948, he created a second cabaret club, The Serail, on the Rue du Colisée.

=== Le Coq d'Or ===
In 1949, he moved to Morocco, bought an old café in Maârif, the cosmopolitan quarter of Casablanca, and transformed it into a prestigious cabaret, Le Coq d'Or. It was frequented by wealthy Moroccans and visiting dignitaries, including King Farouk of Egypt, and it was where Haja El Hamdaouia sang. From 1950, he formed a duo with the Moroccan Haim Botbol, covering a number of Maghrebi classics. After Le Coq d'Or was destroyed in a fire, Salim returned to France.

He lived in Cannes in the early 1960s. In the late 1960s, he recorded a version of "My Yiddishe Momme", a 1925 American vaudeville hit, in Arabic. He expressed affection for the Muslim youth of the Parisian banlieues. When he performed in Jerusalem in the 1960s and said in Arabic from the stage "Long live the Arab nation", the audience threw things at him. He left the stage and never visited Israel again.

Halali's career reached a turning point in when he released a long-playing record in French and performed at the Salle Pleyel in Paris early in 1970. He later gave additional concerts in Paris, Montreal, and Casablanca. Though still successful, Halali decided to retire to Cannes, where he was known for hosting lavish parties at his villa, which had an Arabian nights decor like his cabarets, and a garden with two pet tigers. He continued to perform for private parties as late as 1992. In 1993, having sold his Villa St Charles on St Charles Street in Cannes, he lived in complete anonymity in a retirement home in Vallauris, where his days followed the simple routine of a typical resident.

Throughout his career, Halali was also recognized as a virtuoso darbuka player.

Halali's recordings have enjoyed renewed success with the revival of interest in the Judeo-Arabic musical repertoire since the last years of the 20th century. As one student of Muslim youth culture has written, Halali's voice represents a form of Muslim-Jewish coexistence: "For young French Muslims trying to make sense of their status as Europe's new 'other', the Arab Jew's songs of exile resonate."

== Personal life and death ==
Halali was openly gay, living with his partner Pierre as early as 1949. He died at the hospital in Antibes on 25 June 2005. In accordance with his last wishes, his ashes were scattered in the garden of remembrance at the crematorium in Nice.

== In popular culture ==
Salim Halali is depicted as one of the principal characters in the film Free Men, directed by Ismaël Ferroukhi, released in 2011. He is played by Mahmoud Shalaby, an Israeli Palestinian who learned French to play the role.

== Reception ==
In his book Recording History: Jews, Muslims, and Music across Twentieth-Century North Africa, music historian Christopher Silver wrote that musicians such as Salim Halali, Samy Elmaghribi, Louisa Tounsia and Lili Labassi were some of the "most audible and influential cultural figures of an era of profound change and critical importance", as Morocco, Algeria and Tunisia were initiating their respective political future after the end of French colonial rule. As Silver added, "The records of these and other artists set the tone for the period in question."

Tom Cohen, the head conductor and artistic director of the Jerusalem Orchestra East & West, summed up Halali's life and influence:

The man was an enigma. A homosexual surrounded by women, an outright anti-Zionist who came to appear in Israel. Musically he was diverse as well, and was blessed with lots of color and richness. On the one hand, his singing was essentially Arab. On the other hand, he corresponds with styles that also spoke to Western ears. At heart he was a pop singer, the sort who performed in coffee shops and at weddings.

== Sources ==
- Emile Zrihan rend hommage à Salim Halali in L'Arche, Numéros 573–576, F.S.J.U., 2006, p. 134
- Biographie de Salim Halali
- "Salim Halali : le chantre de la modernité", 21 April 2015, Harissa (in French)
