= Mahieddine Bachtarzi =

Algerian opera singer, actor, writer and director (1897–1986)

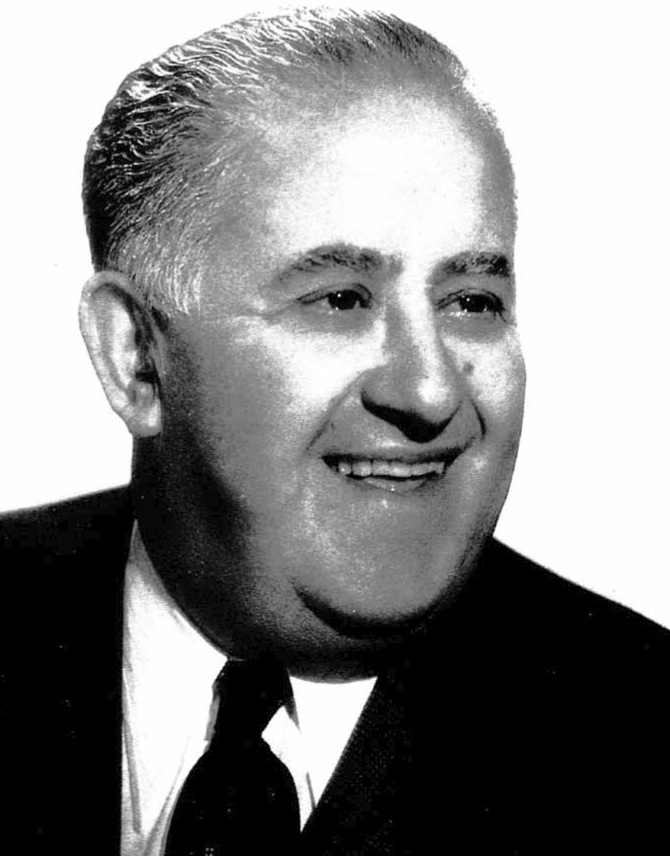
- Born: 15 December 1897; Casbah of Algiers, Algeria
- Died: 6 February 1986 (aged 88); Algiers, Algeria
- Known for: Singer, actor

Mahieddine Bachtarzi (15 December 1897 – 6 February 1986) was an Algerian singer of opera (tenor), actor, writer and director of the TNA (Théâtre National Algérien). He was also the author of some 400 musical works, with a career that spanned over 70 years, gaining many honors throughout his life.

== Early life ==
Mahieddine Bachtarzi was born on 15 December 1897 in the Casbah of Algiers, Algeria into a wealthy family. Attending Islamic studies at the Medersa Ben Osman Sheikh, at the age of fifteen he was entrusted, due to the exceptional quality of his voice, as a reciter of the Qur'an at the Great Mosque of Algiers. However, preferring the limelight to the austerity of the prayer hall, he quickly abandoned the mosque to focus exclusively on singing.

== Career ==
In 1925, he had been acclaimed by the French press as the North Africa equivalent of Caruso, and in 1926 he inaugurated the new Paris Mosque with the first call to prayer. By the early 1930s he had established his own musical troupe that specialized in mixing North African music with popular theatre. Blending French with spoken Arabic, his songs had explicit political overtones which led one collection to be banned in 1937 for anti-French sentiment.

For decades he occupied the center stage of various artistic events in which he participated in the field of singing, music and theater performances, interpreters, material conditions (rooms, decorating and staging) and organizing provincial tours and abroad.

== Death and legacy ==
Bachtarzi died on 6 February 1986. The Mahieddine Bachtazi Theatre, formerly known as the Algiers Opera House, was renamed in his memory.

== Bibliography ==
- Bencheneb, Rachid (1971), "Les mémoires de Mahieddine Bachtarzi ou vingt ans de théâtre algérien", Revue de l'Occident musulman et de la Méditerranée, 9 (9): 15–20
- Evans, Martin (2012), Algeria: France's Undeclared War, Oxford University Press, ISBN 0192803506.
