= Reinette L'Oranaise =

Algerian singer (1918–1988)

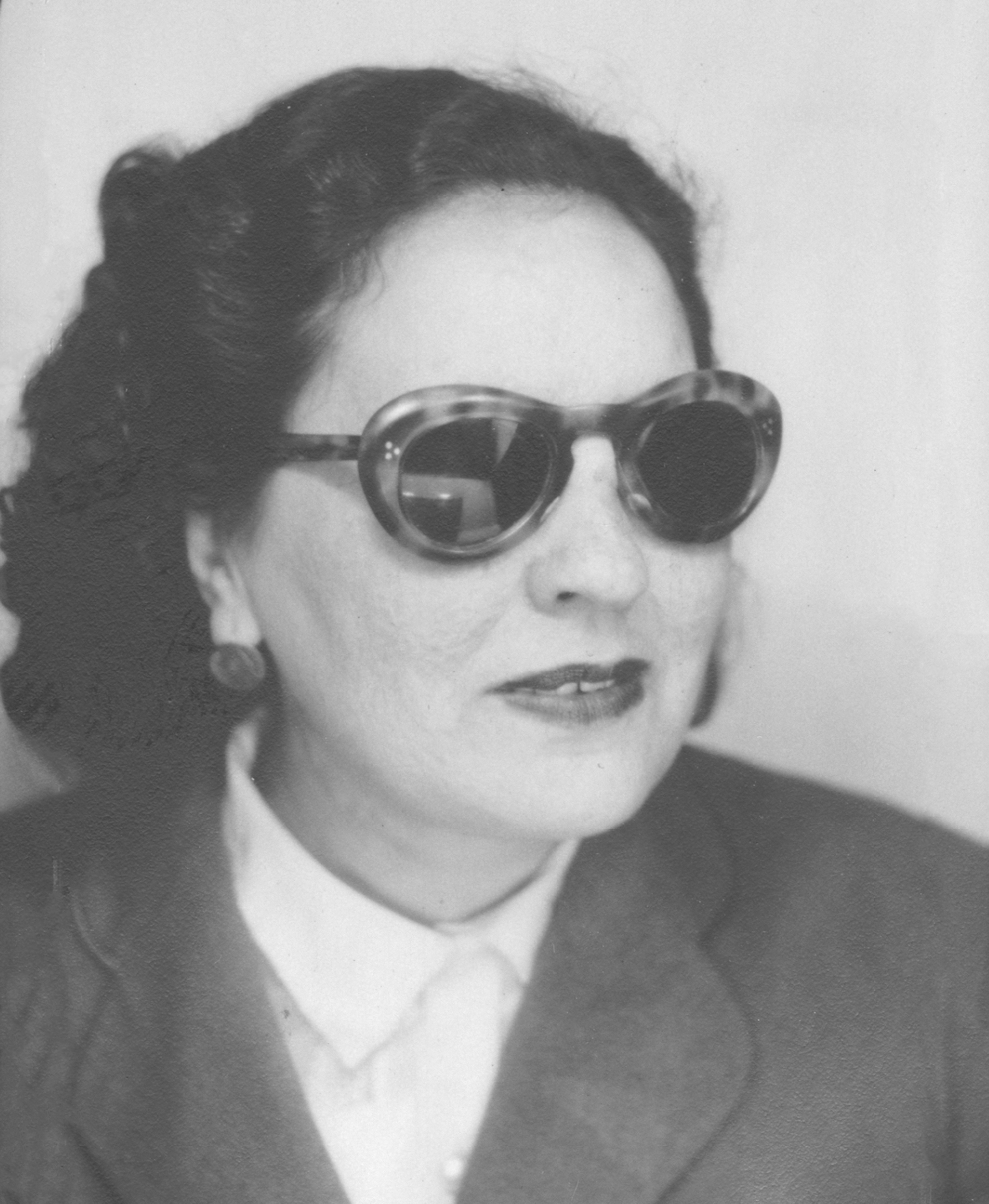
Image of Reinette l'Oranaise

Sultana Daoud (also known as Reinette l'Oranaise; 1918 in Tiaret, Algeria – 17 November 1998, in Paris) was an Algerian Jewish singer, who helped preserve Arab-Andalus music, and introducing the genre to European audiences.

== Early life ==
She was born in Tiaret, the daughter of a Moroccan Rabbi. Being blind as a result of smallpox when two years old, she studied at a school for the blind in Algiers, until her mother encouraged her to take up music. She studied with Saoud l'Oranais, who gave her the nickname Reinette l'Oranaise ("Queenie from Oran"). From him she learned to play several instruments, and learned a great many traditional songs in the Arab-Andalus and Raï styles.

== Career ==
They moved to Paris in 1938, but at his suggestion she soon returned to Algeria. There she joined the orchestra of Meriem Fekkaï, until Algerian independence ended her career - she had been opposed to independence. Unable to find work in her home country, she returned to France, playing in restaurants and private parties for the Maghrebi Jewish community in Paris.

In the 1980s the increased interest in "World Music" brought her to the media's attention, and she was once again able to perform to large audiences. She sang in Arabic and ladino and was a highly respected chaabi performer, performing with even Cheik El Hadj M'Hamed El Anka, who made over 130 lps. She was very loved by Oran's Muslim population and left a rich chaabi legacy.

== Discography ==
- Jewish Arab Song Treasures (2006) (AKA Trésors de la Chanson Judéo-Arabe)
- Mémoires (2001)
- I wish I was Egyptian (2000)

Her recording of the song "Qum Tara" was used in the film A la Place du Coeur (1998).

== Documentaries ==
- Reinette L'Oranaise, le port des amours (1991) by Jacqueline Gozland
