= Culture of Algeria =

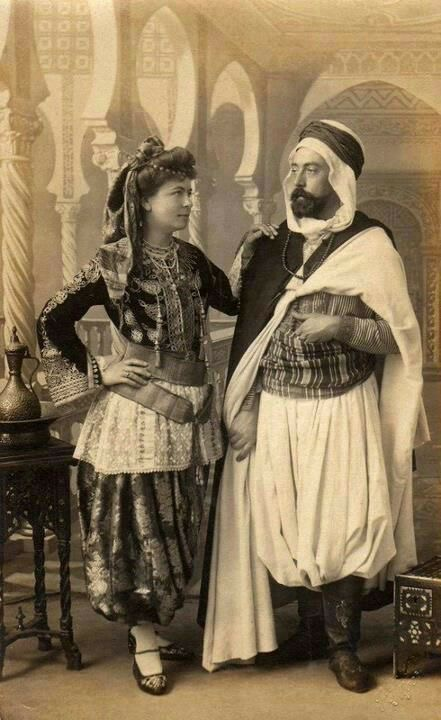
Algerian traditional clothing

The culture of Algeria encompasses literature, music, religion, cuisine, and other facets of life in Algeria.

== Religion ==
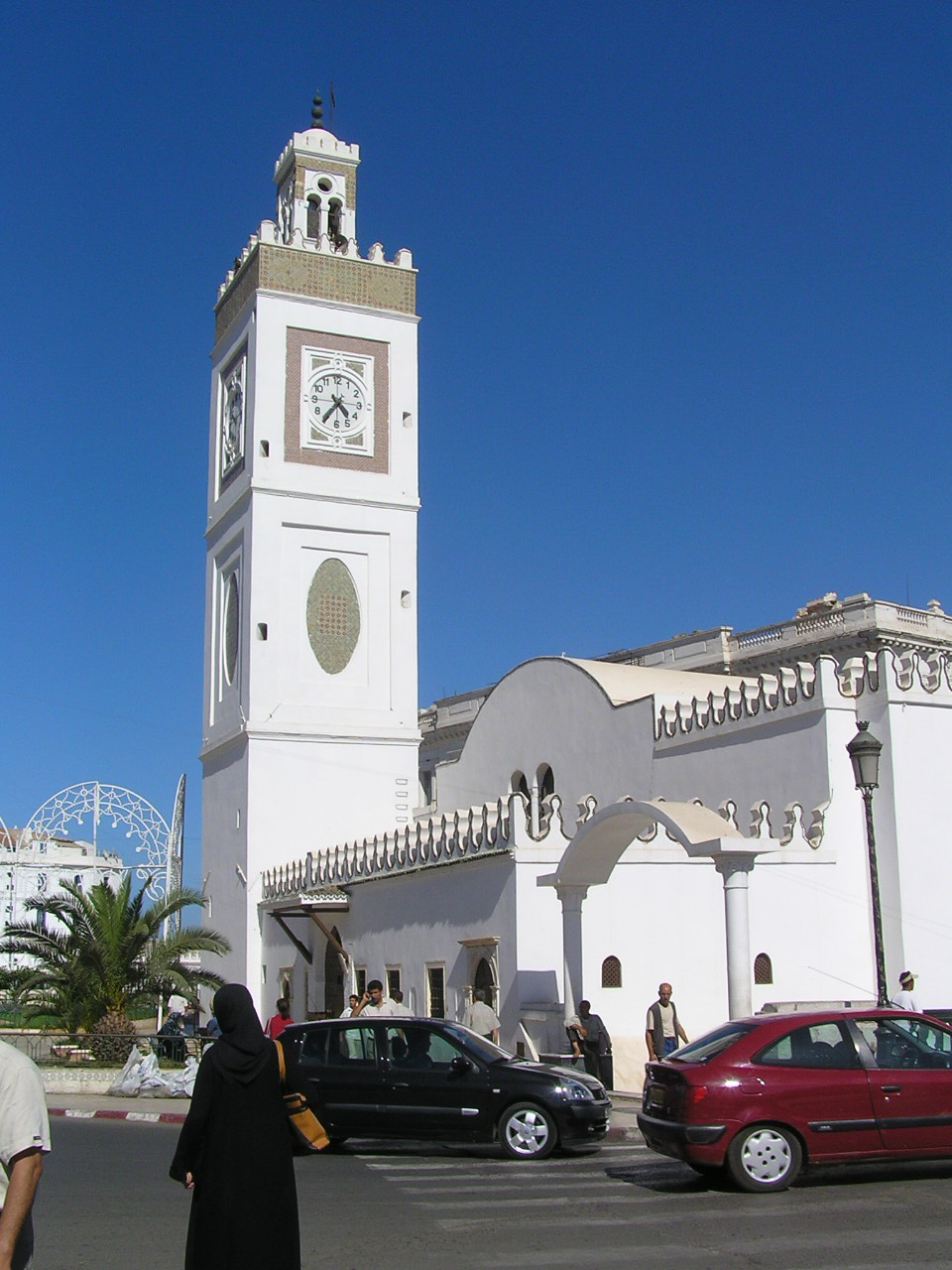
A mosque in Algiers

The state religion of Algeria is Islam. About 99% of the Algerian population are Muslims, specifically Sunni Muslims. It also has Christian and Jewish minorities who make up less than 1% of the population.

Islam was introduced to Algeria with the Muslim conquest of the Maghreb in the 7th century. Under Umayyad rule, Musa ibn Nusayr continued the program of spreading Islam and the Arabic language through missionary activity and chose seventeen religious scholars to convert the locals. Many people became Muslims at the hands of these scholars and the inhabitants of the Maghreb gradually converted to Islam. Caliph Umar ibn Abd al-Aziz sent to the governor of Ifriqiya Ismail ibn Abdallah all scholars and men of culture, who were ordered to teach the religion of Islam. They were distributed around the regions of the Maghreb. In less than one century, the great majority of Christians converted to Islam with 'great zeal that they sought martyrdom', and the final conversions took place in the first two centuries after the hijrah. The Arab migrations to the Maghreb consolidated this process.

Since independence after the Algerian War, regimes have sought to develop an Islamic Arab socialist state, and a cabinet-level ministry acts for the government in religious affairs. President Houari Boumédiene sought to increase Islamic awareness and to reduce Western influence, although the rights of non-Muslims continued to be respected.

== Culture ==
=== Greeting ===
Greetings in Algeria have been described as lengthy. In addition to handshaking, Algerians ask about health, family and work to show concerns for others. Friends and family also exchange kisses on the cheeks. Some Algerian men might avoid prolonged eye contact with women and avoid personal questions. These behaviors are observed out of respect and to maintain appropriate social manners. Most Algerians uphold Arab traditions of hospitality, and are friendly and helpful.

=== Cuisine ===
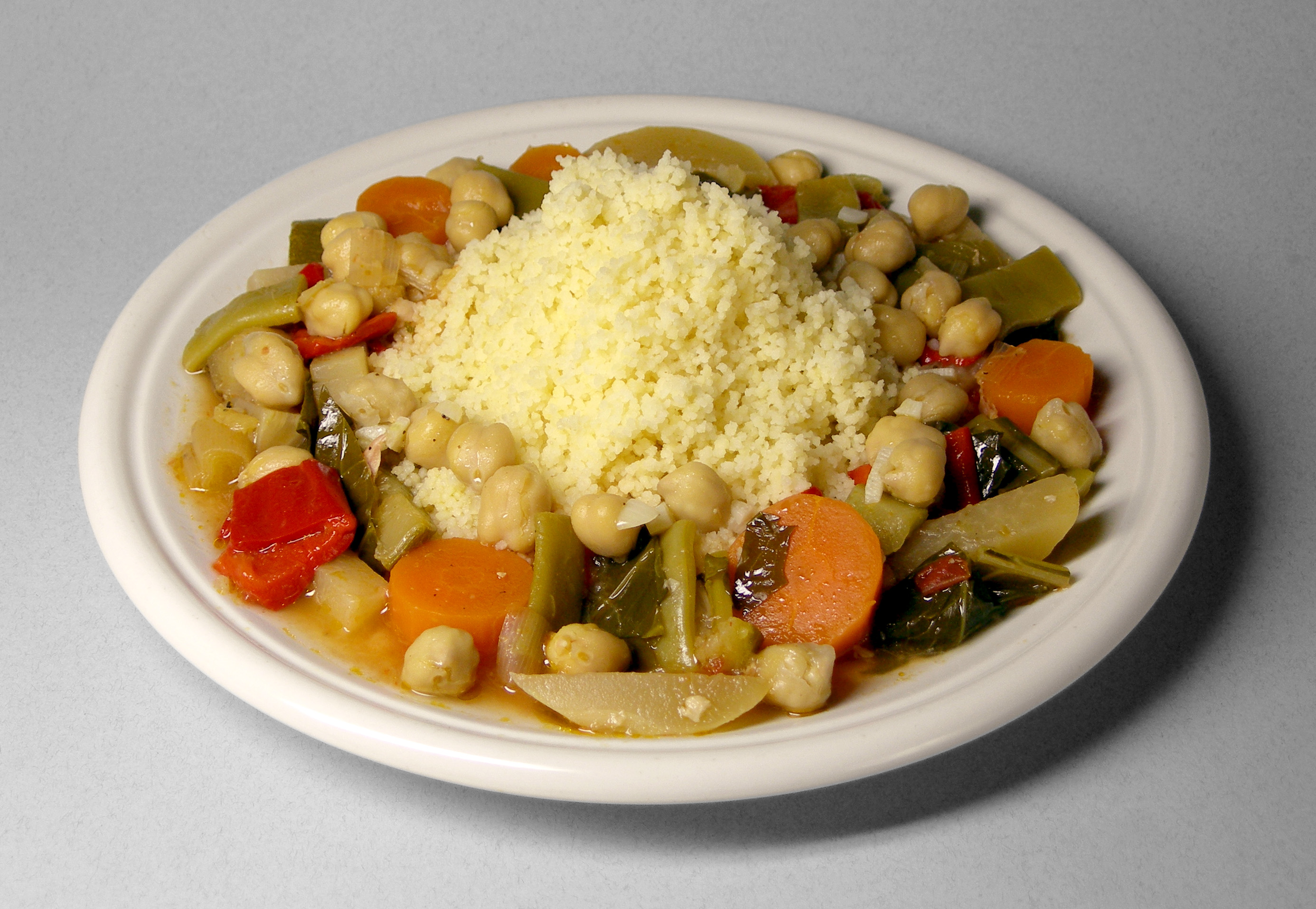
Couscous (Arabic: كسكس) with vegetables and chickpeas, the national dish of Algeria

Algerian cuisine features cooking styles and dishes derived from traditional Arab, Amazigh, Turkish, and French cuisine. The influence of Jewish, Spanish, Berber, and Italian cuisines can also be observed. The cuisine is flavorful, often featuring a blend of traditional Mediterranean spices and chili peppers. Couscous is a staple of the diet, often served with stews and other fare. Other popular Algeria dishes include doulma, chakhchoukha, and chtitha.

=== Dress ===
Algerian clothing, influenced by the country's rich history and cultural heritage, varies among different regions and communities in Algeria. Traditional Algerian clothing is Islamic custom, although there are Algerians who adopted clothing based on Western style, especially in the cities. In urban areas, there is a mix of traditional clothing and increasingly common Western-style clothing, whereas traditional clothing is much more common in rural areas. As an Islamic country, Algeria has limits on dress code. Most Algerians follow Islamic dress codes, and foreigners are expected to show modesty, such as female visitors having to avoid exposing their shoulders, knees or chest.

One of the most common traditional garments for both men and women in Algeria is djellaba. The djellaba is a long, loose-fitting robe that typically reaches down to the ankles. It is made from various fabrics, such as cotton or wool. The djellaba usually has long sleeves and a hood, and it is often worn over other clothing. In rural areas, women often wear a traditional dress called haik. The haik is a large rectangular piece of fabric, usually made of wool or cotton, which covers the body and is wrapped around the head as a hood. The haik is typically white, but it can also be found in other colors and patterns. It is of Andalusi Arab origin. The traditional dress for men in Algeria includes a loose-fitting shirt called gandoura. The gandoura is usually made of lightweight fabric and is worn over sirwal. Men also wear a variety of head coverings, such as turbans or fez hats. In urban areas and on special occasions, Algerians often wear modern Western-style clothing. However, traditional garments are still highly valued and are worn for cultural celebrations, religious events, and weddings. Other examples of traditional Algerian dress include the qashabiya, kaftan and karakou. In Kabylia and the Aurès, Berber jewellery made of silver, beads, and other items was an important component of Berber identities up to the mid-20th century.

=== Literature ===
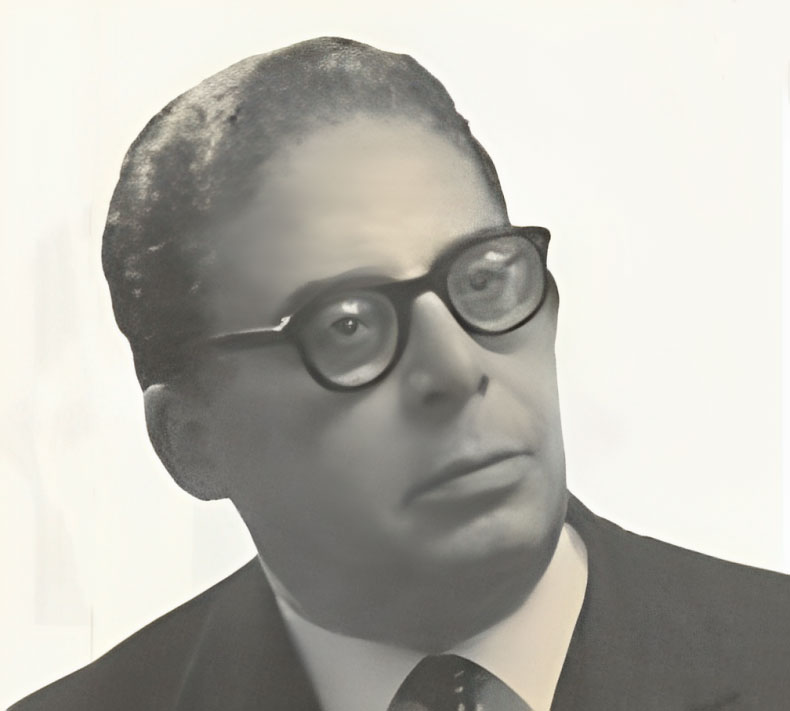
Moufdi Zakaria, a 1908-1977 poet from the Algerian War

Modern Algerian literature, split between Arabic and French, has been strongly influenced by the country's recent history. Well-known poets in modern Algeria are Moufdi Zakaria, Mohammed Al Aid, Achour Fenni, Amar Meriech, and Azrag Omar. Famous novelists of the 20th century include Mohammed Dib, Albert Camus, Kateb Yacine, Ahlam Mosteghanemi, and Assia Djebar. Among the important novelists of the 1980s were Rachid Mimouni, later vice-president of Amnesty International, and Tahar Djaout, murdered by an Islamist group in 1993 for his secularist views.

In philosophy and the humanities, Jacques Derrida, the father of deconstruction, was born in El Biar in Algiers. Malek Bennabi and Frantz Fanon are known for their writings on decolonization. Augustine of Hippo was born in Tagaste (modern-day Souk Ahras), and Ibn Khaldun, though born in Tunis, wrote the Muqaddima while staying in Algeria.

Algerian culture has been strongly influenced by Islam. The works of the Sanusi family in pre-colonial times, and of Emir Abdelkader and Sheikh Ben Badis in colonial times, are widely known. The Latin author Apuleius was born in Madaurus (Mdaourouch), in what later became Algeria.

=== Music ===
The Algerian musical genre best known abroad is raï. Originating in western Algeria in the early 1900s as a combination of popular music and traditional Bedouin desert music, it emerged as a major world-music genre in the 1980s. It is a pop-flavored, opinionated take on folk music, performed by internationally-known talent such as Khaled and Cheb Mami. It sounds like pop music, sung in Arabic with tonal and instrumental influences of traditional Bedouin music, as well as cultural and religious influences. Singers of Raï are called cheb (Arabic: شاب, or shabab, meaning young) as opposed to sheikh (Arabic: شيخ, shaykh, meaning old). Within Algeria, raï remains the most popular musical form, but older generations tend to prefer shaabi, performed by singers such as Dahmane El Harrachi.

Although raï is now generally welcomed and praised as a cultural emblem of Algeria, in the post-independence period the form was often attacked or criticised by Islamic and government authorities. These attitudes began to change around 1985, partially due to the influence of Colonel Snoussi, an ex-military officer turned raï artist. Another reason for the shift in attitude toward raï was the music's growing popularity in France, which the Algerian government viewed as positive.

Andalusi music, brought from Al-Andalus by Morisco refugees, can still be heard in many older coastal towns.

Kabyle music, exemplified by Idir, Ait Menguellet, or Lounès Matoub, also enjoys a wide popularity.

== Women in Algeria ==
In comparison to other Muslim majority countries, Algerian women overall have historically possessed more levels of freedom. Algerian women have seemed to be offered more leniency and have continuously proved to have an important voice in Algerian society. However, while they seem to receive leniency, they still suffer from an overall lack of protection of legislation or cultural norms.

== Visual arts ==
=== 1910: a generation of precursors ===
During the first half of the twentieth century, artists mainly recuperated models and patterns imported – or imposed – by an imperialist French power.

As Edward Said argued in his book Orientalism in 1978, Algerian artists struggled with the perception and representations of Westerners. Almost a century after the conquest by the French, Azouaou Mammeri (1886–1954), Abdelhalim Hemche (1906–1978), Mohammed Zmirli (1909-1984), and Miloud Boukerche (1920–1979) were the first to introduce easel painting. They benefited from "breaches" in the educational system and were able to pursue training in plastic arts. Even though they attempted to focus on the reality of Algerians' everyday routine, they were still, to a certain extent, incorporated in the Orientalist movement.

The tradition of oriental illumination and miniature was introduced around the same period, through artists such as Mohamed Racim (1896–1974) or Mohamed Temman (1915-1988). It is the two main expressions of figuration in a country where popular abstract symbolic, Berberian or Arabic, are integrated mainly through architecture, furniture, weaving, pottery, leather and metal workmanship.

How to reappropriate one's own history is a dynamic in Algerian contemporary art, reflecting on the deep social changes people experienced.

Artists attempt a successful introspective work in which the duality in terms of identity creates a dynamic that overcomes "orientalism" and exoticism. The main stake is for the artist and the spectator to reappropriate a liberty of expression and interpretation. Main artists of that period are: Boukerche, Benaboura, Ali Ali Khodja, Yelles, or Baya.

=== 1930: a generation of founders ===
The vast majority of the artists incorporate the theme of the independence war, from those who lived it to the artists who use it as a legacy. Impregnated by all the artistic and ideological movements that marked the first half of the twentieth century, artists are concerned with the society they live in and denounce segregation, racism and injustice that divided communities of colonial Algeria. There was a clear shift from orientalism and exoticism: new themes such as trauma and pain appear, for instance, in the portrait The Widow (1970) by Mohamed Issiakhem.

"Art is a form of resistance as it suggests and makes visible the invisible, the hidden, it stands alert on the side of life".

It was also a time when Algerian artists started organizing themselves, through the National Union of Plastic Arts or UNAP (1963), for instance; artists such as Mohamed Issiakhem or Ali Khodja were part of it.

=== Non-figuration and "Painters of the Sign" ===
Abdallah Benanteur and Mohamed Khadda opened a path for abstract (non-figurative) Algerian art. They were French since childhood and emigrated to France. They were followed by artists such as Mohamed Aksouh, Mohamed Louail, Abdelkader Guermaz and Ali Ali-Khodja. Mohamed Khadda wrote: "If figurative painting appears as the norm in terms of expression, it is the result of an acculturation phenomenon". Artworks are a form of liberation in that sense, as literal representations do not seem to fully emerge from the cluster of exotism and orientalism.

The "Painters of the Sign" are Algerian artists born in the 1930s who, at the beginning of the 1960s, found inspiration in the abstract rhythm of Arabic writing. The term "peintres du Signe" was coined by the poet Jean Sénac in 1970. He was hosting in Alger the "Gallerie 54". The first collective exhibition reunited Aksouh, Baya, Abdallah Benanteur, Bouzid, Abdelkader Guermaz, Khadda, Jean de Maisonseul, Maria Manton, Martinez, Louis Nallard and Rezki Zérarti. He wrote in his presentation: "In this gallery 54, which aims at being a gallery of research in permanent contact with the people, we have brought together artists, Algerian or having deep links with our country" "We can assert, with Mourad Bourboune, that our artists do not only exhume the devastated face of our Mother, but, in the midst of the Nahda (renewal), they build a new image of the Man and stare endlessly at his new Vision".

=== Aouchem ===
Algerian artists reconnected with part of their historical and cultural legacy, especially the influence of Berber culture and language. A great deal of attention was brought upon the Berber culture and identity revendications after the Berber Spring in 1988, and it impacted the cultural production. Denis Martinez and Choukri Mesli participated in the creation of the group Aouchem (Tattoo), which held several exhibitions in Algiers and Blida in 1967, 1968 et 1971. A dozen artists, painters and poets decided to oppose the mainstream organization of art – especially of figurative art, they believe to be represented by the UNAP, the National Union for Plastic Art. They opposed their policy of excluding many active painters. According to its manifesto : "Aouchem was born centuries ago, on the walls of a cave of Tassili. It continued its existence until today, sometimes secretly, sometimes openly, according to fluctuations of history. (...) We want to show that, always magical, the sign is stronger than bombs".

In spite of a surge of political violence following the war of independence, where the hegemony of the Arabic culture and language tended to overlap with the Berberian culture, the plastic traditions of popular signs managed to be maintained. Aouchem builds on this traditional legacy.

=== Naivety and expressionism ===
Since the 1980s, there has been a renewal and also a form of "naivety" of trying to go past the trauma of the war and address new contemporary issues. Baya (1931–1998) is the example of an Algerian success story. Her work was prefaced by André Breton and exposed by André Meight when she was a teenager. She, who had not known her mother as she was orphaned by the age of 5, has since produced colorful watercolors with fake symmetries and questioning the figure of the Mother. She is part of the art brut movement.

Expressionism was dominated by Mohamed Issiakhem, affectionately nicknamed "Oeil de lynx" (lynx eye) by his fellow writer Kateb Yacine. When he was 15, he had an accident with a grenade. Two of his sisters and his nephew died, and his forearm had to be amputated. His personal drama resonates in work. He expressed themes like grief and loss through the use of thick pastes and universal figures; as an echo of the hardships of the Algerian war, as well as the universal struggle of those silenced and oppressed.

=== Renewal of visual arts ===
Since the 1980s, a new generation of Maghrebi artists has arisen. A large proportion is trained in Europe. Artists locally and among the Diaspora explore new techniques and face the challenges of a globalized art market. They are bringing together various elements of their identity, marked by the status of immigrant of first or second generation. They address issues that speak to the Arab world with an "outsider" lens. Kader Attia is one of them. He was born in France in 1970. In a large installation in 2007 called Ghost, he displayed dozens of veiled figures on their knees, made of aluminum foil. Adel Abdessemed, born in Constantina in 1970, attended the École des Beaux-Arts in Algiers, Algeria and then Lyon, France. Through his conceptual artworks, he displays strong artistic statements using a wide range of media (drawing, video, photography, performance, and installation). In 2006, he exhibited at the David Zimmer gallery in New York City. One of his artworks was a burnt car entitled Practice Zero Tolerance, a year after riots in France and in the midst of a resurgence of terrorist attacks since 11 September 2001. Katia Kameli also brings in the multiple aspects of her identity and environment, through video, photographs and installations.

== Sports ==
Football, handball, athletics, boxing, martial arts, volleyball and basketball are the most popular sports in the country.

== See also ==
- Architecture of Algeria
- List of Orientalist artists
- Outline of culture
- Women in Algeria
