= Kateb =

Kateb is a surname, and may refer to:

Kateb derives from كاتب which means scribe in Arabic.

- Kateb Yacine, Algerian writer
- Kateb al Shammary, Saudi Arabian lawyer
- Amazigh Kateb, Algerian singer and musician
- Faiz Mohammad Katib Hazara, also known as Fayż Mohammad Kāteb, Afghan intellectual
- George Kateb, American political writer
- Marjan al-Katib al-Islami, also known as Marjan Kateb Islami, Iranian calligrapher
- Reda Kateb, French actor
