= David Jisse =

French musician and producer (1946–2020)

- Born: 12 April 1946; Pessac, France
- Died: 18 July 2020 (aged 74); Paris, France
- Occupation: Composer

David Jisse (12 April 1946 – 18 July 2020) was a French composer and radio producer. He also worked as an arranger, guitarist, singer, and pianist.

== Biography ==
Jisse wrote the scores for numerous theatrical productions and films. He formed the duo David et Dominique alongside Dominique Marge. They performed the French version of the Idir album A Vava Inouva. In a conference with composer Luc Ferrari, Jisse discovered the world of experimental music.

Jisse produced multiple programs for France Musique, such as Le Grand Bécarre, Libre-Cour, and Un poco agitato. He also produced the program Fins de mois difficiles for France Culture. From 1998 to 2013, he directed La Muse en circuit, founded by Luc Ferrari.

David Jisse died in Paris on 18 July 2020 due to cancer at the age of 74.
