= Mohamed Abdennour =

Ptit Moh
- Born: Mohamed Abdennour c. 1966; Algieria
- Genres: chaâbi; film music; theater music
- Occupations: composer, arranger, musician
- Instruments: Algerian mandole, oud, banjo
- Years active: 1999-present
- Formerly of: Gnawa Diffusion

Mohamed Abdennour (stage name Ptit Moh) is an Algerian composer, arranger and instrumentalist, active in France and playing a fusion of different musical forms mixed with chaabi.

== Early life ==
He has been called a virtuoso on the Algerian mandole or mondol, "one of most gifted on this instrument very present in the Châabi music." In France he has worked with other artists including, providing background music or participating in their bands, as well as arranging music for film and theater. The bands he has played with have played a wide mixture of music, including rap, ragga, reggae, jazz and raï. In addition to showing what the mondol can do, he also has shown the capabilities of other stringed instruments used in North Africa, including the banjo, oud, mandolin, sintir, guitar and laúd.

== Biography ==
Abdennour began playing stringed instruments at age 8, including mandolin, mondol, banjo and guitar. He met Amar Ezzahi, one of the masters of the Algerian chaâbi in 1983, when he was only 17 years old. Two years later, he began to work with him, playing banjo and performing. Working with the experienced musician gave him knowledge and experience and he refined his technique. It was during his studies with Ezzahi that he began to perfect his mandole playing. He left for Paris in the about 1994. That was a painful period called "Black Decade" during which Ezzahi decided not to sing anymore.

Ptit Moh continued his path in music in Paris, playing oriental or eastern music for weddings and festivals. He played with Alabina, Chico and the Gypsies and Idir for the album Identités, Safy Boutella and participated in film music.

Amazigh Kateb asked him to join the band Gnawa Diffusion in 1999 for the album Bab El Oued Kingston. The band was from Grenoble, in the South-East of France, and played a mixture of rap, ragga, reggae, jazz, raï. He also participated in Desert Rebel's album Desert Rebel in 2006. He continued to play with Gnawa Diffusion until they disbanded in 2007, but played again with the lead vocalist Amazigh Kateb on his solo album Marché noir. He was still playing with Kateb in 2015 in trio that also included Karim Ziad in a jazz festival, in Shenzhen, China.

After the breakup of Gnawa Diffusion, he drew upon his years of musical experience and began a solo project, called the "Ptit Moh Project". The music he creates under the project is a mixture of jazz, world music and chaabi.

He played mandol and guitar in the theatrical work "Renayates", starring Houria Aïchi in the spring of 2015. He not only played but arranged music for Malya Saadi's album "Ya Bhar" in 2013. Ptit Moh also worked on the last album of Idir, published in April 2017.

In 2014, he played with the. flamenco, player, Juan Carmona in the Ibn Zeydoun hall in Alger and in the Cité de la Musique in Marseille This collaboration continues today; their music mixes chaâbi and flamenco.

As a composer, he composed music for Medina, Gnawa Diffusion, and Chico and the Gypsies.

Ptit Moh is the artistic director of the El Gusto Orchestra.

== Discography ==
Mohamed Abdennour appears on a variety of albums as a background musician or as part of a band.

- 1999: Sahara (Alabína)
- 1999: Identités, (Idir)
- 1999: Bab El Oued Kingston, (Gnawa Diffusion)
- 2002: Uni-Vers-Elles, (Djur Djura)
- 2002: Guerouabi el Hachemi (Guerouabi El Hachemi)
- 2002: DZ Live, (Gnawa Diffusion)
- 2003: Souk System, (Gnawa Diffusion) OCLC 871875939
- 2006: Fucking Cowboys, (Gnawa Diffusion)
- 2006: Desert Rebel, (Desert Rebel)
- 2007: Ishumars Les Rockers Oubliés Du Désert, (Desert Rebel)
- 2009: Marchez noir, (Amazigh Kateb)
- 2011: Des Racines Et Des Chants (Nassima)
- 2015: Dark En Ciel, (Sarah Riani)
