= Glendi =

Glendi Γλέντι
- Genre: Greek Music
- Dates: Last weekend of November (26 & 27 November 2021)
- Locations: Adelaide, Australia
- Years active: 40 (as of 2018)
- Founders: Lions Club of Adelaide Hellenic

In Australia, Glendi is an annual weekend long festival that celebrates Greek culture in Australia. Established in 1978, it's held in Adelaide during the last weekend of November at Bonython Park since 2013 and is the largest ethnic festival in South Australia. The festival has been taking place for over 40 years. Glendi is the Greek word for "party" or "celebration".

== Australia ==
Glendi continues to be the major project of the Lions Club of Adelaide Hellenic. It raises money for a variety of charities and also provides an opportunity for the various local Greek brotherhoods, associations and clubs to raise money for their benefit. Music is performed by local, interstate and international artists. Art pieces and historical artifacts are displayed in the Cultural Marquee. Food from all regions of Greece is available. With an estimated 50,000 people turning out for the festivities every year, it is one of Australia's largest multicultural festivals and also one of the largest festivals of its type in the Southern Hemisphere.

== 2009 ==
For the first time in many years, the Royal Adelaide Showgrounds went under massive redevelopment and construction. To attract more visitors and patrons, the 2009 Glendi was held at the Goyder and Jubilee Pavilions and the outdoor areas surrounding the pavilions at the showgrounds. Since the Italian "Carnevale" festival was held there earlier in the year, it is expected that many other ethnic and cultural festivals will follow suit. Popular Greek artist Yiannis Katevas sang, accompanied by Adelaide's prestigious Greek Lyceum dance school.

== Since 2011 ==
After the first cancellation in 2010, the festival returned. Since the last festival in 2018, it's been on hiatus.
