= Ksenia Milicevic =

French painter, architect and town planner

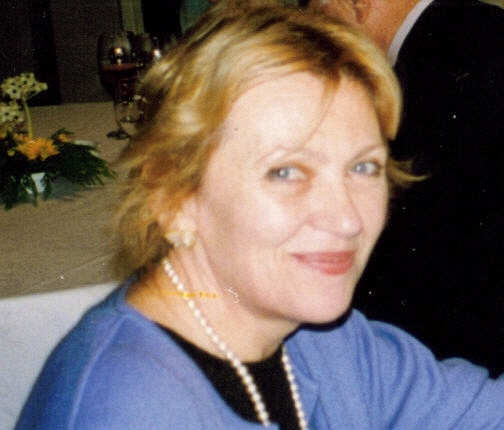
- Milicevic in 1996
- Born: September 15, 1942 (age 84); Drinić, Bosnia and Herzegovina
- Occupation: Painter

Ksenia Milicevic (born September 15, 1942) is a French painter, architect and town planner. She is based in Paris, with a studio in Bateau-Lavoir in Montmartre and also maintains a base in South West France.

== Life ==
Ksenia Milicevic was born in 1942 in Drinić, Bosnia and Herzegovina. Her mother was born in Lackawanna, New York and her father in Montenegro. Both were partisans engaged in guerrilla campaigns during the Second World War. Following the Fourth anti-Partisan Offensive from January to April 1943 and the Fifth, May to June 1943, in south-eastern Bosnia and northern Montenegro, she was left with her grandparents in Montenegro. After the war, her parents joined the diplomatic service and she lived with them in Sofia and Prague.

Ksenia Milicevic discovered architecture, mosaics, frescoes and paintings in old monasteries. Her father, also a painter, gave her the gift of his oil-paints, resulting in her first oil painting at the age of fifteen. After studies in the V° Senior High School and one year in the University of Engineering in Belgrade, she moved to Algiers in 1962. There she studied architecture in the School of Architecture and Urbanism at the Institute of Urbanism. She graduated from both in 1968. In her spare time Milicevic joined the painting class of the painter M'hamed Issiakhem, in the School of Fine Arts, located in the same building. She worked for a year in ECOTEC with the team of the Brazilian architect Oscar Niemeyer. Interested in the Italian Renaissance, she traveled to Italy in 1965 to view the great Masters.

Milicevic moved to S.M. de Tucuman in the north of Argentina to work as an architect. Here she joined the art school of the National University and graduated in 1976. Her first exhibition took place in Tucuman in 1970.

She has also lived in Spain and Mexico and has settled in France since 1987. In 1989 she opened a workshop at Bateau-Lavoir in Montmartre. Her studio is next to that of Endre Rozsda. Since 1976 she has been exclusively dedicated to painting. She has held 120 individual and collective exhibitions throughout the world.

Since 2010 Ksenia Milicevic has been publishing essays alerting to the progressive destruction in art of the three factors on which a work is based: beauty, space and time, the destruction of art signaling and favoring the annihilation of man.

In 2011 the Museum of Painting of St. Frajou, Haute Garonne, France, was inaugurated with a selection of thirty paintings by Milicevic in the permanent collection. In 2012 Ksenia Milicevic created the International Children's Painting Biennial. In 2014, Ksenia Milicevic created the Art Resilience movement and in 2015 International Exhibition Art Resilience. In May 2016, Ksenia Milicevic participates in the Euro-Mediterranean Congress - Marseilles: Resilience in the World of the Living, under the presidency of Boris Cyrulnik, 19–21 May 2016, Intervention on resilience in art.

== Gallery ==
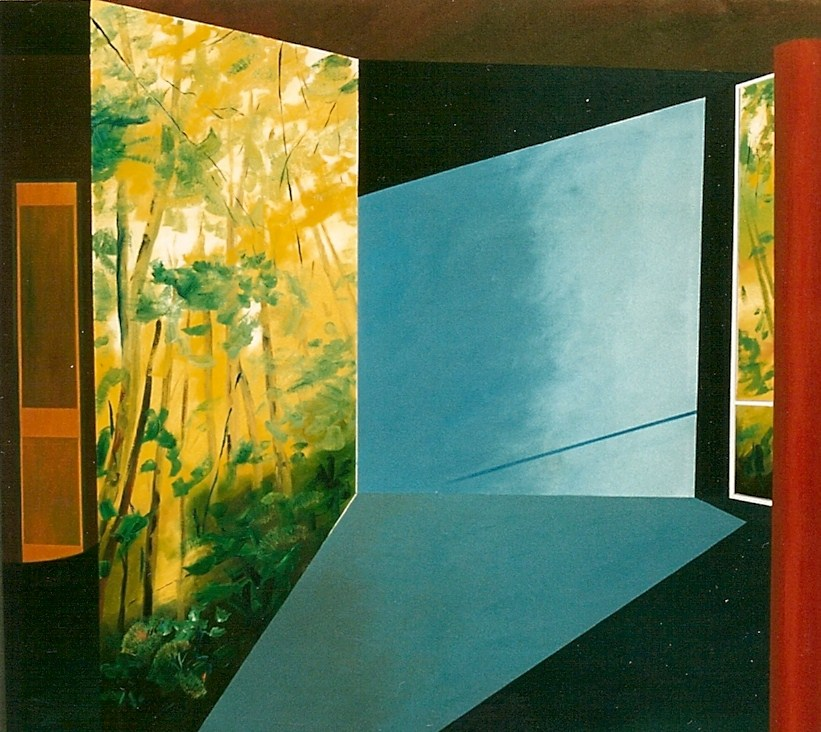
Azur attendri d'octobre pâle et pur, 1998

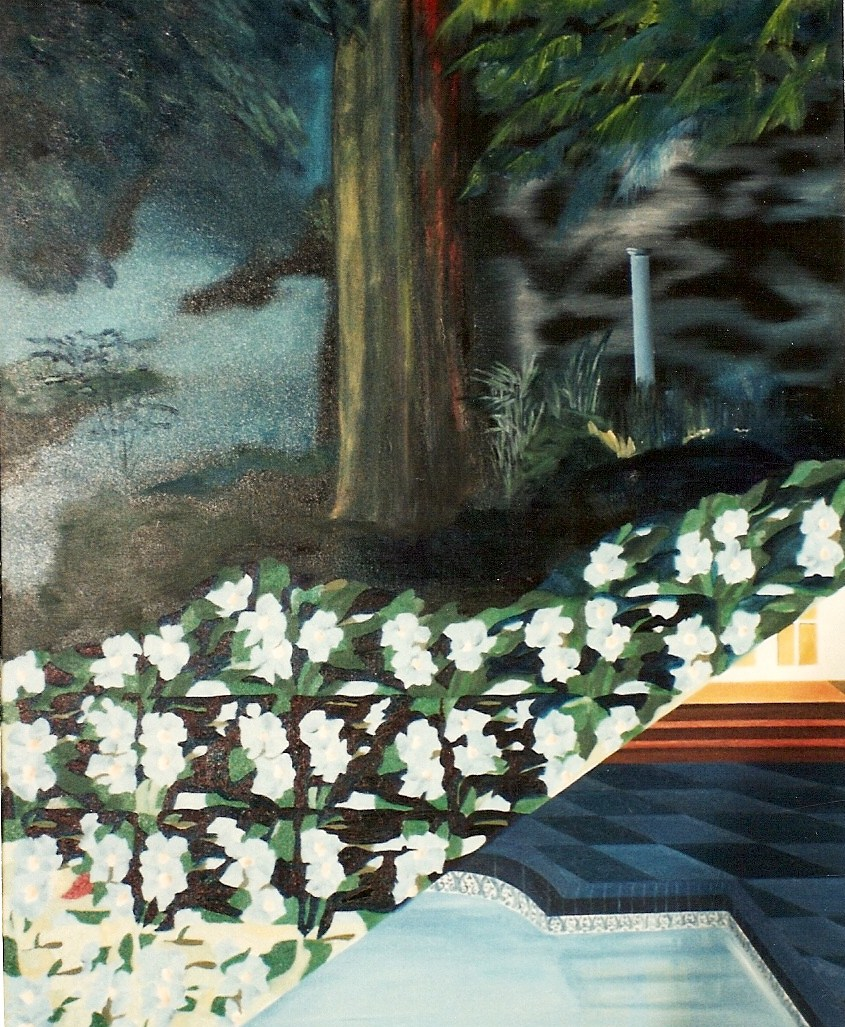
Celui qui vient après, 1996

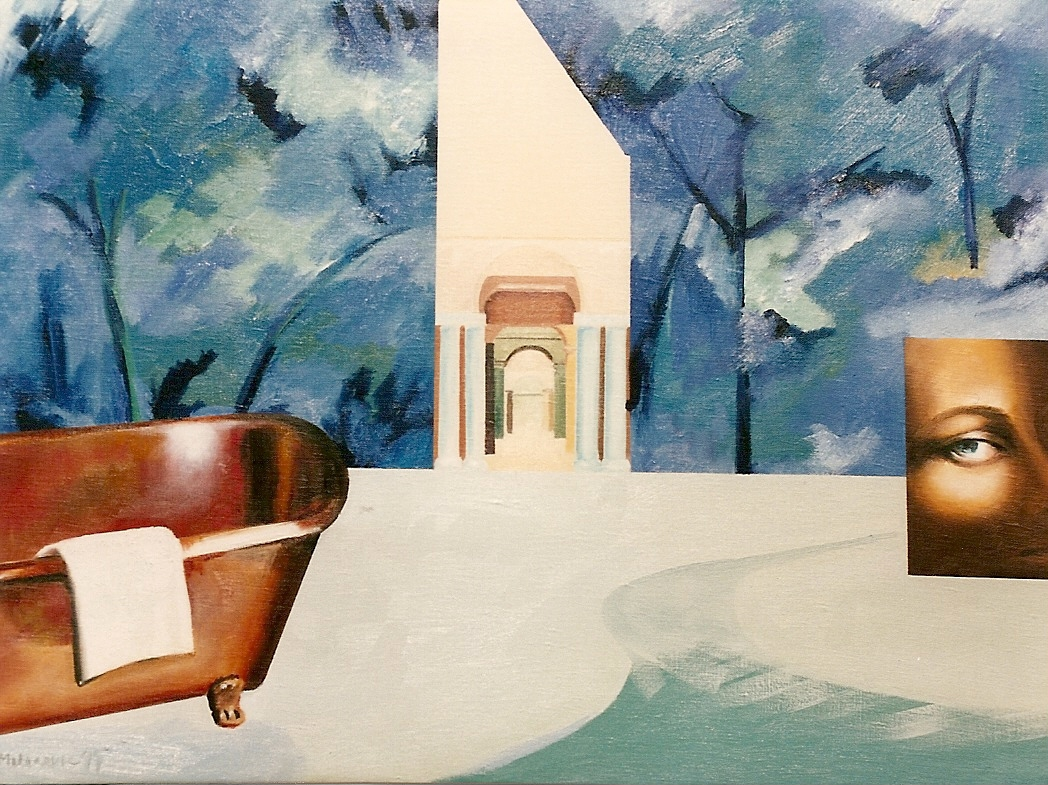
Le voyage d'hiver, 1996

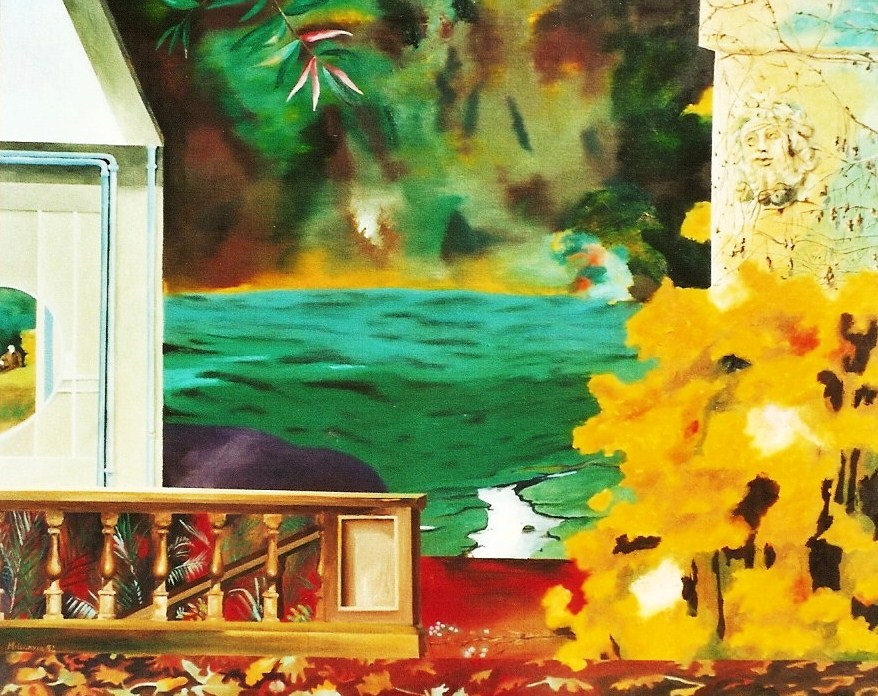
Silence de midi 1993

== Selected exhibitions ==
- 2026 Artexpo Nex York 2026 - World Wide & Artavita, United States
- Art Santa-Fe, Santa Fe Art Fair, United States
- Art Fair, Chicago, United States
- Art Shopping, Carrousel du Louvre, Paris, France
- 2024 Galerie Séraphine, Mende, France
- 2023 INEDITOS, Museo de Bellas Artes de Granada, Palacio de Carlos V, Espagne
- 2017 Forum artistique, Aurignac, Haute Garonne
- 2016 Congrès Euro-Méditerranéen, Archives Départementales des Bouches du Rhône - Marseille - France
- 2014 Eglise de Montesquieu. Montesquieu - France
- 2011 Permanent Collection inauguration. Saint-Frajou Paintung Museum - France
- 2005 Tribute to Alberto Magnelli. Mario Marini Museum Pistoia - Italy
- Etruscan Museum. Siena - Italy
- Consiglio Regionae. Firenze - Italy
- Museum of Cluj. Romania
- 1998 Mexican Cultural Center. Brasília - Brazil.
- 1997 Palais des Expositions. Geneva - Switzerland
- 1995 Gallery 20 Fine Art. Paris - France.
- French Cultural Center. Oslo - Norway
- 1986 Institut Français d'Amérique Latine. Mexico - Mexico
- 1984 Palais des Congrès. Brussels - Belgium
- 1983 Graphic Art Festival. Osaka - Japan
- 18 French painters, Tamayo Contemporary Art Museum. Mexico - Mexico,
- 1982 Gallery Misrachi. Mexico - Mexico
- 1981 Museum of Contemporary Art. Madrid - Spain
- 1980 18° International Exhibition Joan Miró. Barcelona - Spain
- 1976 Theater of the eighth. Lyon - France
- 1972 Gallery Lirolay. Buenos Aires - Argentina
- 1970 University Gallery. Tucuman - Argentina

== Museums ==
- Fine Art Museum. Granada - Spain
- Museum de la Casa de los Tiros. Granada - Spain
- Museum of Contemporary Art. Salamanca - Spain
- Museo de Cuenca
- Museum of Art Actual. Ayllon - Spain
- Museum Municipal. Segobre - Spain
- Museum of Contemporary Art. Malabo - Guinea
- Museum Pinacoteca Municipal de Deifontes. Spain
- Museum of Armilla. Granada - Spain. Ficha n°7. Armilla. 20 de junio 1983.
- Municipal Museum. Long - France
- Polytechnic Institute. Mexico - Mexico
- French Institute of Latin America. Mexico - Mexico
- Museum Zarsuela del Monte, Spain
- Museum Civico. Spilimbergo - Italy
- Foundation Paul Ricard. Paris - France
- Cultural Center of the Embassy of Mexico. Brasília - Brazil
- Paintings Museum of Saint-Frajou. Haute Garonne - France.
- Art Collection, French Alliance, Quito, Ecuador

== Books by Ksenia Milicevic ==
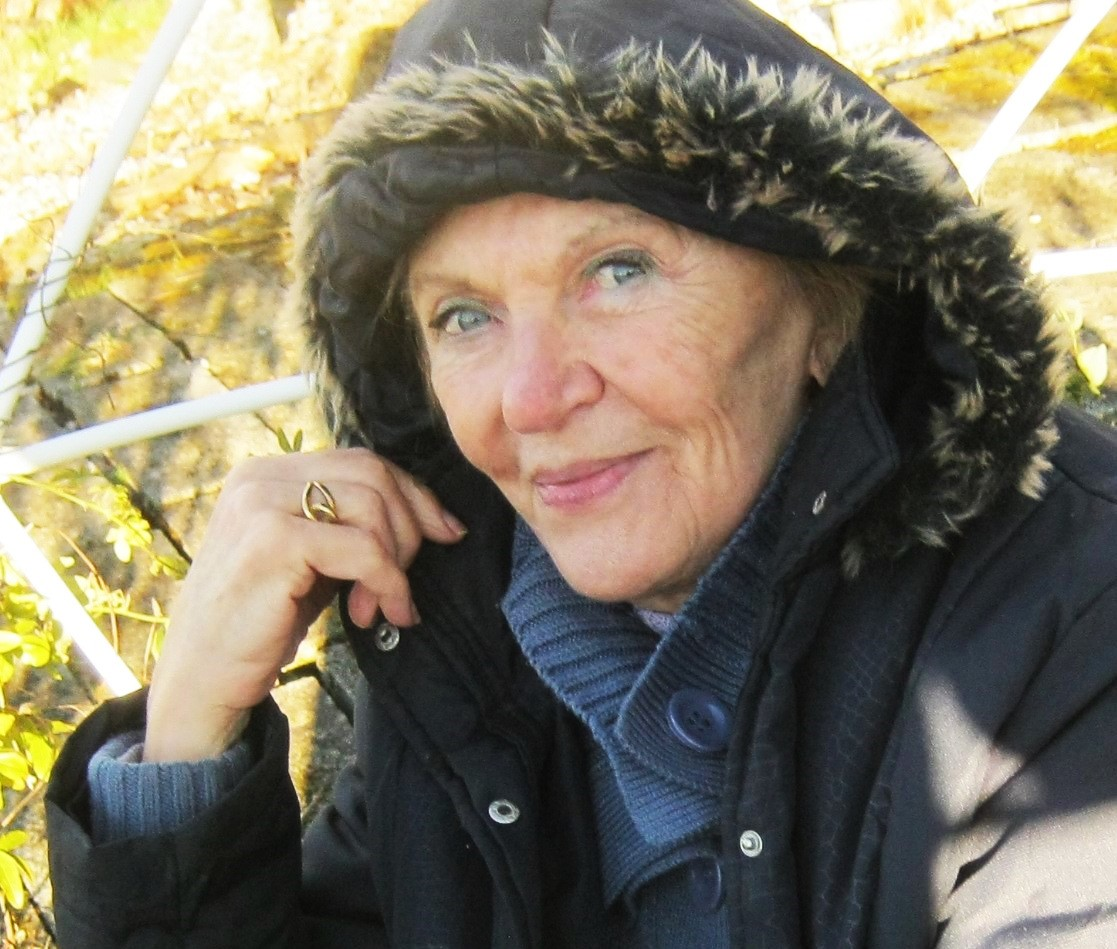
Ksenia Milicevic en 2023

- Ksenia Milicevic, Art-confusion.com - De l'image d'art à l'oeuvre d'art, éd. Edilivre, Paris, 2013
- Ksenia Milicevic, What art therapy for resilience ? Communications from the 4th World Congress on Resilience, p. 229
- Ksenia Milicevic, Résilience en art et art-thérapie pour la résilience, éd. Edilivre, Paris, 2020
- Ksenia Milicevic, Resilience, drawings, Amazon, 2021
- Ksenia Milicevic, Ange du jour - Jeu de divination, drawings, Amazon, 2021
- * Ksenia Milicevic, Collection Livres participatifs, Apprentissage du dessin 1. Randonnées sous les arbres, 2. Herbarium, 3. Maison au bord de la mer, 4. Lundi au marché, 5. Maître Corbeau, autoédition, Amazon, 2022
- Ksenia Milicevic, Collection Résilience en Art : 1. Soulage, un trait noir sur la peinture, autoédition, Amazon, 2022, 2. Qui êtes-vous Mr. Duchamp ? autoédition, Amazon, 2022
- Ksenia Milicevic, 60 Artistes du mouvement Art Résilience, autoédition, Amazon, 2024
- Ksenia Milicevic, Musée de peinture de Saint-Frajou, dans le village de la fontaine miraculeuse, autoédition, Amazon, 2025

== Conferences ==
- Between November 2015 and March 2016 Ksenia Milicevic gave a series of five lectures on Resilience in art, in the Painting Museum of Sain-Frajou, France : Resilience - a current concept, What is art ?, Beauty - subjective or objective ?, Contemporary art, The responsibility of the artist.
- Participation in the Euro-Mediterranean Conference - Marseille: Resilience in the World of the Alive, chaired by Boris Cyrulnik, 19–21 May 2016, Departmental Archives of Bouches du Rhône. Intervention on Resilience in art.
- 2017, lecture in the Paintung Museum of Saint-Frajou : "1917-2017 un siècle d'iconoclasme".
- Between November 2017 and March 2018 Ksenia Milicevic gave Cycle of four lectures on Images in painting : 1. What does the night tell us? , 2. Tales of light, 3. The murmur of water, 4. The voice of trees, in the Painting Museum of Sain-Frajou, France
- March 2018 - Conference at Domaine des Tilleuls in Huos (Haute Garonne), France : Painting, 19th - 20th centuries: from the golden rule to the absence of rules
- 2018 - Participation in the 4° Resilience World Congress organized by Resilio - International Association for the Promotion and Dissemination of Resilience Research in partnership with the University Aix-Marseille in Marseille (France), from 27 to 30 June 2018. Intervention on Resilience in Art: What Art Therapy for Resilience?
- 2020 december - Design, applied art and plastic art in the age of resilience, The 6th International Conference of the Faculty of Applied Arts, Helwan University, Cairo, Egypt.
- 2021 5° Congres on Resilience (Online), Sustainability factors and sustainability of art - Yaoundé, Camerun.
