= A Vava Inouva =

Studio album by Idir
- Released: 1991
- Recorded: 1991
- Studio: Gimmick Studios
- Genre: Kabyle
- Label: Globe Music

Idir chronology
A Vava Inouva (1991)	Les Chasseurs de Lumières (1993)

A Vava Inouva is the 1991 album by Idir, an Algerian Kabyle singer. The title track, also his debut single, was a big international hit. The album also features other songs he became well-known for, such as "Azwaw", "Zwit Rwit" (the source for Khaled's "El harba wine), "Ssendu" and "Cfiy"

== Song: "A Vava Inouva" ==
"A Vava Inouva", is the title track from the album. It was originally "A Baba-inu Ba" alternatively A baba inuba meaning "Ô mon père Inuba" (Oh, my father Inuba), and is an example of Kabyle music.

"A Vava Inouva" was a lullaby composed by Idir and Ben Mohamed (real name Mohamed Benhamadouche) and was written for Nouara, a singer on Radio Algiers. However after she decided against it, Idir decided to interpret the song himself accompanied by the singer Mila. This version was an immediate success, making it arguably the best-known song in the Kabyle language internationally.

Many other versions exist, such as the 1999 version with Karen Matheson, ; a singer with a repertoire of Scottish Gaelic songs. That version appeared on Idir's album Identités.

The song "A Vava Inouva", which was originally released in 1976, has since also been translated into several languages, including Arabic, Spanish, French, Greek and others. David Jisse and Dominique Marge released as a duo the French version "Ouvre-moi vite la porte". Yiannis Katevas released a Greek version as "An ginotane" (in Greek Αν γινότανε) featuring Efi Strati. Video on YouTube

== Track list ==
1. A Vava Inouva
2. Isefra
3. Ssendu
4. Azger
5. Muqleɣ
6. Zwit Rwit
7. Cfiɣ
8. Azwaw
9. Tagrawla
10. Tiɣri b ugdud
11. Acawi
12. Ay Arrac Nneɣ
13. Cteduɣi
14. Izumal
15. L'Mut
16. W' Ibɣun
17. Aɣrib

== Personnel ==
- Idir: Vocals and guitars (all tracks), bendir on tracks 6, 8, 13 and 16
- Pierre Bluteau: guitars on tracks 12, 15 and 16
- Tarik Aït Hamou: guitars on all other tracks
- Jean Musy: moog
- Michel Ripoche: violin
- Gérard Geoffroy: flute, moog programming
- Hachemi Bellali: bass on tracks 7 and 10
- Michel Hervé: bass on tracks 13–17
- André Ceccarelli: drums on tracks 2, 4, 6 and 8
- Arzeki Baroudi: drums on tracks 10 and 14–17, bendir on tracks 10–12, 15 and 17
