= Patrick Autréaux =

French writer and scholar

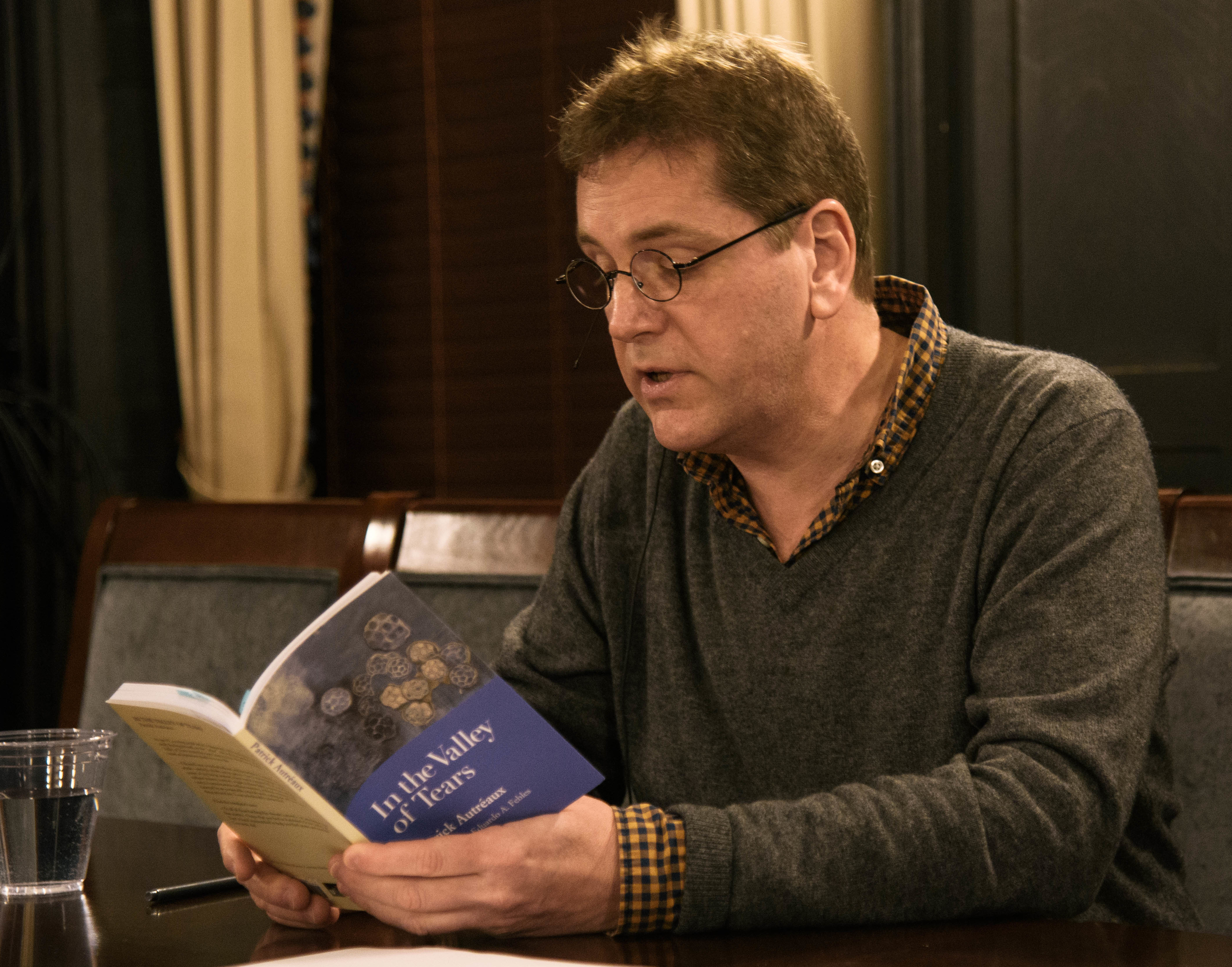
- Patrick Autréaux (2020)
- Born: 14 March 1968 (age 58); Melun, France
- Occupation: Novelist
- Writing career
- Genre: Literary fiction

Patrick Autréaux (born 14 March 1968) is a French writer who has held appointments as a writer-in-residence at Boston University (2018–2019, and 2024) and a visiting scholar at the Massachusetts Institute of Technology (2018). After training in medicine and anthropology, he practiced as an emergency-room psychiatrist in Paris and started writing poetry and contemporary art reviews before publishing fiction. He is affiliated with MIT French+.

== Career ==
An early experience with cancer led him to write three books on the topic of illness: Dans la vallée des larmes, Soigner et Se survivre. Dans la vallée des larmes relates the experience of a thirty-five year old doctor coming to terms with a lymphoma whose diagnosis had been suddenly announced. Soigner is about a patient in remission who resumes his previous role of doctor and cares for his dying grandfather. Se survivre consists of seven meditations on the state of illness.

Since these early writings, his work has developed in new directions: a hidden family drama that unravels during the expulsion of an undocumented person in France (Les Irréguliers), the agitation of a tree shaken by a storm as a metaphor for the loss of a loved one (Le grand vivant) and a narrative retracing Autréaux's personal journey between medicine and literature (La Voix écrite). Les Irréguliers was born out of the experience the author had when seeking news of a detained undocumented friend. Le grand vivant labels itself a “standing poem” which brings to life the dying moments of a beloved grandfather, who until his last breath, had sheltered the presence of his deceased wife and was in the eyes of his grandson, a protective figure.” Le grand vivant was performed in 2015 the French Avignon theater festival. Lastly, La Voix écrite is an autobiographical tale on the long road to writing. This tale speak particularly of the relationship between the author and his former editor "Max" behind whom we decipher "the protective figure of J.-B. Pontalis", psychoanalyst and editor at Gallimard.

About his novel Quand la parole attend la nuit (Verdier, 2019, selected for the Prix Femina and Prix Décembre), the French literary journal AOC noted, "The learning in question here is much broader than that of becoming a practitioner. The art of medicine for Patrick Autréaux is the art of being in the world or, to use one of his terms, of being in the 'cosmos'." His book Pussyboy (Verdier, 2021) is "a strong, disturbing, and daring story without ever being raw, radical in everything it reveals", and according to Diacritik "one of the most important books in recent years" that also signals a new inflection in his work.

Patrick Autréaux announced in 2023 the opening of a cycle, titled Constat, with the release of The Saint of the Family. Liberation described it as "a text on faith written by an atheist and whose engine is 'care' in the strong sense of the term: a concern, a generous responsibility as much as a therapeutic intervention." The French literary journal Zone Critique added, "The saint of the family is none other than Thérèse de Lisieux, in short Sainte Thérèse... Here, she almost makes herself an imaginary friend of the child in the story... No family inquiry, no hidden motives, or aggressive vindictiveness, but the observation of a reality that was and its progressive surfacing under the watchful reader's eyes. If the text deploys an attempt to unmask, it is not to reveal any mystery therefore, but to consider the other side of the coin, the flip side of history." AOC further calls it "a journey along which illusions fall away, the inessential fades away and the meaning of things becomes clearer."

The book titled L’Époux (meaning, the spouse) continues the cycle inaugurated by The Saint of the Family. It opens on a wedding but like all of Autréaux's works, "each event is the start of a journey." This journey allows Autréaux to explore two key tensions: first, "the jewish parents of his spouse who have a hard time accepting their son's homosexuality, and even more so with their future son-in-laws", and, second, "catholicism's (and all other religion's) rejection of homosexuality."

Patrick Autréaux's work has also been published in numerous journals (such as Esprit, Europe, NRF, Socrates on the beach, MuseMedusa, Lettres Françaises, Décapage, Mettray, Zone Critique, etc.). His poetry has appeared, amongst other outlets, in Phréatique, Poésie 91, Van (Ho Chi Minh City), MuseMedusa (Canada), Sarrazine, Noto, REVU, Margelles, and Catastrophes.

In 2022, he was a Fellow at The Dora Maar House (Nancy B. Negley Artists Residency Program); and in 2023, writer-in-residence at the Internationale House of Literature in Brussels (Passa Porta).

== Political positions ==
In 2016, Autréaux published with the Diderot Institute a polemical take on the terrorist attack, "Je suis Charlie, un an après", written for a round table at Harvard University and Boston University. And in 2019, Politis published an open letter to his representative LREM about the Yellow Vest Protests: "Congresswoman, why I don't believe you"

== List of works ==
=== Works of fiction ===
- Dans la vallée des larmes (récit) Gallimard, 2009.
- Soigner, Gallimard, 2010.
- Le Dedans des choses, Gallimard, 2012 (Amic Award (fr)).
- Se survivre, Éditions Verdier (fr), 2013.
- Les Irréguliers (roman), Gallimard, 2015.
- Le Grand vivant (théâtre), Éditions Verdier (fr), 2016.
- La Voix écrite, Éditions Verdier (fr), 2017.
- Dans la vallée des larmes et Soigner (réunis), Gallimard, Folio, 2017.
- Quand la parole attend la nuit (roman), Éditions Verdier (fr), 2019 (finalist for Prix Décembre and Prix Femina)
- Pussyboy, Éditions Verdier (fr), 2021
- L'instant du toujours, Éditions du Chemin de fer, 2022
- La Sainte de la famille, Éditions Verdier (fr), 2023
- L’Époux, Gallimard, 2025
- Avenue des Amériques, Gallimard, 2026

=== Translations ===
- In the Valley of Tears, tr. Eduardo A. Febles, UIT Books, USA, 2019
- A School of Life, tr. Tobias Ryan in Socrates on the beach, USA, 2023
- Pussyboy, tr. Hugo Alejandrez, Canta Mares, Mexico, 2024
- New Prose, tr. Tobias Ryan in Asymptote, UK, 2024
- From the Other Side, tr. Tobias Ryan in 3:AM Magazine, UK, 2024
- Two Annies, tr. Tobias Ryan in 3:AM Magazine, UK, 2024
- The Revolution Amid the Revolution, tr. Tobias Ryan, in Sublunary Editions, USA, 2024
- Placenta-Book: on Agua Viva de Clarice Lispector, tr. Tobias Ryan, in AGNI, USA, 2025
- Excerpt from Pussyboy, tr. Tobias Ryan in Socrates on the beach, USA, 2025.
- The Holy Oils of Jean Genet, tr. Tobias Ryan, The Black Herald Magazine, UK, 2025.
- Vassal of the Sun: on Melville: A Novel by Jean Giono, tr. Tobias Ryan, in Asymptote, UK, 2025
- The Social Night: on Denis Belloc, tr. by Tobias Ryan, in 3:AM Magazine, UK, 2025
- Taking Stock: On Ferdinando Camon, tr. by Tobias Ryan, World Literature Today, USA, 2025
- Excerpt from L’Époux, tr. Tobias Ryan, in Tolka, Ireland, 2025
- And I Write Amid the Disorder, tr. Tobias Ryan, Socrates on the beach, USA, 2026
- The Near Abyss, tr. by Tobias Ryan in The Kenyon Review
- The Moors of Time, tr. by Tobias Ryan in The Lincoln Review, Issue 7

=== Essays and articles ===
- Portrait d’un poète vietnamien : Hoàng Câm, Carnets du Vietnam, No. 12, 2006
- Thérèse de Lisieux, La confiance et l'abandon, présentation et choix de textes, Éditions du Seuil, 2008
- Nuit verte, Libres Cahiers pour la psychanalyse (fr), L’amour de transfert, No. 23, 2011
- Se survivre, La Nouvelle Revue Française, Moi & Je, No. 598, 2011
- L’Enfant de Goya, Libres Cahiers pour la psychanalyse (fr), Partir, revenir, No. 25, 2012
- Signe vivant, Décapage (fr), No. 46, 2013
- Cybercondrie, Libres Cahiers pour la psychanalyse (fr), Une inquiétude mortelle, l’hypochondrie, No. 27, 2013
- Et moi je vous en pose des questions? Décapage (fr), No. 52, 2015
- Je suis Charlie-Un an après, note de l’Institut Diderot (Paris), 2016
- Les Perches du Nil, de l’écosystème éditorial, Décapage (fr), No. 55, 2016
- Une fantaisie, in Jean Genet, l’échappée belle, Musée des Civilisations de l'Europe et de la Méditerranée|MuCEM Gallimard, 2016
- L'été Nabokov, Études (fr), avril 2018
- Vous aviez mon cœur, in Penser le soin avec Simone Weil, PUF, 2018
- Petit d'homme, in Revue française de psychanalyse, L'Impatience, 2, Vol 82, 2018
- La Sainte Boue, in Cahiers Claude Simon, 2018
- Les Saintes Huiles de Jean Genet, La Nouvelle Revue Française, n°633, novembre 2018
- Kateb Yacine, la révolution dans la révolution, Les Lettres françaises (fr), n°169, mars 2019
- De l’autre côté : à propos de Bao Ninh, Les Lettres françaises (fr), n°171, juin 2019
- Vassal du Soleil, in catalogue Jean Giono, MuCEM Gallimard, 2019
- Dans un mois, dans un an, revue Par ici la sortie, n°2, Éditions du Seuil, 2020
- Le Triton à la perle, Éditions Pou, 2020
- Et j'écris dans ce désordre, Europe (fr) (Jean Genet), 2021
- Les Saintes Huiles de Jean Genet, revue Mettray, 2021
- Denis dit D. Belloc, Zone critique, 2021
- Constat, à propos de Ferdinando Camon, Europe, 2023
- Le livre placenta. A propos de Clarice Lispector, in Zone critique, 2022 & La Nouvelle Revue Française, 2023
- Presque l'Abîme, in Revue Esprit, 2023
- La Lande du temps, in Revue Esprit, 2024
- Vassal du soleil. A propos de Pour saluer Melville de Jean Giono, in Revue Esprit, 2025

=== Writings on art ===
- madé ou l’Art de la synecdoque (galerie Intérieure, Lille), 2005
- L’Ithaque d’André Le Bozec (Musée Matisse du Cateau-Cambrésis), 2005
- Un homme heureux. Portrait d’un collectionneur, in catalogue de la donation Le Bozec (Musée des Beaux-Arts de Cambrai), 2007
- Parole à voir : dialogues en noir blanc gris (Musée des Ursulines, Mâcon), 20O9
- Sous-bois, huiles de L. B. Spadavecchia (Faisanderie de Sénart, Étiolles), 2010
- Alix Le Méléder (galerie Bernard Zürcher, Paris), 2010
- Vrai corps, œuvres sur papier de Bertrand Lagadec, (Atelier blanc, Champlay), 2010
- Guy de Lussigny ou L’Art des arlequinades décomposées (catalog on Lussigny, (Musée des Beaux-Arts de Cambrai), 2010
- Les deux éternités, ardoises de Nicolas Kennett, in "Escaut : rives, dérives" (Somogy Éditions d'art), 2011
- … du printemps de Thierry Thieû Niang, Éditions du Musée d'Art contemporain du Val-de-Marne|Mac/Val, 2013
- Texte et entretien in Alix Le Méléder - Traces, peintures, Éditions Tituli, 2016
- Still life selon TM, préface à Qu'en moi Tokyo s'anonyme de Thibault Marthouret, Éditions Abordo, 2018
- Eve Gramatzki, l’extase empêchée, in Eve Gramatzki, une histoire critique, 1972–2022, Éditions Méridianes, 2022

=== Interviews ===
- Interview with Thibault Marthouret (Chaire de philosophie à l'hôpital, "Ces présences invisibles", épisodes 2 et 3, in French)
- Diacritik (with Rodolphe Perez): "Retour sur vingt années d'écriture," June 23, 2025
- Diacritik (with Rodolphe Perez): Interview on L’Époux, June 6, 2025
- Fier.es et Queer (with Stéphanie Lemaire), 27 avril 2025
- Colegio de Mexico (with Laura Sofia Rivero and Melina Balcazar), Sept. 10 2024
- BBC News Mundo (with Norberto Paredes), Sept. 6 2024
- Zone critique (with Rodolphe Perez) : "Procéder des lignes de faille" (part 1 et "habiter la brèche" (part 2)
- Parole inattendue (with David Milliat), France 2, March 12, 2023
- L'Heure bleue (avec Laure Adler, France Inter), February 7, 2023
- Diacritik (with Johan Faerber), March 4, 2021
- A reading and conversation (with Odile Cazenave), WBUR, July 5, 2020
- Politis (with Christophe Kantcheff), October 1, 2019
- Diacritik (with Johan Faerber), September 16, 2019
- Strangeness from within (with Odile Cazenave), WBUR, June 10, 2018
- J'ai déjà connu le bonheur (with Jean-Christophe Rufin), April 1, 2018
- L'Heure Bleue (with Ruwen Ogien and Laure Adler), March 17, 2017
- Poésie et ainsi de suite (with Manou Farine), January 13, 2017
- Politis (with Christophe Kantcheff), February 17, 2016
- Hors Champs (with Laure Adler), Septembre 29 2015
- Un autre jour est possible (with Tewfik Hakem), April 4, 2013
- Du jour au lendemain (with Alain Veinstein), April 7, 2012
- Pas la peine de crier (with Marie Richeux), February 27, 2012
- Décision santé (with Gilles Noussenbaum), September 2009

== Awards and distinctions ==
- Laureate of the Villa Marguerite-Yourcenar 2011
- Amic Prize Winner, Prix de l'Académie française 2012
- Laureate of the Paris-Québec Fellowship 2012
- Writing Residency Winner, Fondation des Treilles 2015
- Prix Coupleux-Lassalle 2016
- Hemingway Grants for translation (Institut français de New York) 2018
- Writer-in-residence at Boston University (Boston, USA) 2018–2019
- Dora Maar House fellow (Brown Foundation) 2022
- Writer-in-Residence at Passa Porta (International house of literature in Brussels)
- Writer-in-residence at Boston University (Boston, USA) 2024
