= Gnawa Diffusion =

Algerian Gnawa music band based in France

Gnawa Diffusion is an Algerian Gnawa music band based in Grenoble, France. The group's lead singer, Amazigh (literally meaning 'Free Man' in Tamazight), is the son of the Algerian writer and poet Kateb Yacine. Although there is a strong Gnawa influence, the band is noted for its mix of reggae and roots music. Gnawa Diffusion is very popular in Algeria and is also well known in many other countries including Morocco, Tunisia and France. The band's lyrics are in Algerian Arabic, Tamazight, French and English. Gnawa Diffusion started their career in 1993 with the release of the album Légitime différence.

Members of the band:

- Amazigh Kateb - vocal and gimbri
- Mohamed Abdennour (Ptit Moh) - Algerian mandole, banjo, krakebs, choir
- Pierre Bonnet - bass
- Philippe Bonnet - drums
- Salah Meguiba - Keyboard, oriental percussion, choir
- Pierre Feugier - guitar, choir, krakebs
- Abdel Aziz Maysour
- Amar Chaoui - percussionist, choir

The lead singer's lyrics are often controversial. Themes range from discussions of poverty in Algeria or corruption in government to denunciations of global military actions and perceived imperialism. Nevertheless, in spite of a strong political direction, this band also has numbers which focus on self-determination and improvement.

== Discography ==
- 2025: Rwina
- 2012: Shock El Hal
- 2007: Fucking Cowboys (D'JAMAZ Production)
- 2003: Souk System (Warner)
- 2002: DZ Live (Next Musique)
- 1999: Bab el Oued - Kingston (Musisoft)
- 1997: Algeria (Melodie)
- 1993: Légitime différence
