= M'hamed Issiakhem =

Algerian painter

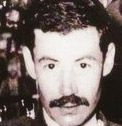
- Born: 17 June 1928; Azeffoun, Tizi Ouzou, Algeria
- Died: 1 December 1985 (aged 57); Algiers, Algeria
- Known for: Painting
- Website: Fan Site

M'hamed Issiakhem (Arabic: محمد إسياخم), born June 17, 1928 and died December 1, 1985, is one of the founders of the modern Algerian painting.

== Biography ==
M'hamed Issiakhem, born on 17 June 1928 in Taboudoucht, a small village near Azeffoun, around 43 kilometers from Tizi Ouzou (Algeria). In 1931 his family moved to Relizane where he spent most of his childhood. In 1943 he handled a stolen grenade, from a French military camp, which exploded. Two sisters and a nephew of his died. Hospitalized for two years, he lost his left arm. Between 1947 and 1951 he was in the Student Society of Fine Arts at the School of Fine Arts of Algiers and followed the courses of miniaturist Omar Racim. Between 1953 and 1958 he attended the Ecole des Beaux-Arts de Paris. Issiakhem in 1958 left France to Germany, and then to East Germany where he had been established until the Algerian independence.

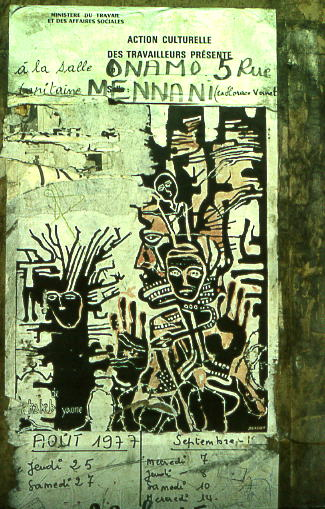
Poster for a Kateb Yacine Play in Algiers, by M'hamed Issiakhem in 1978

In 1962, Issiakhem returned to Algeria, where he was the cartoonist of the daily Alger Republicain. In 1963 he was one of the founding member of the National Union of Plastic Arts. From 1964 to 1966 he was head of painting workshop at the School of Fine Arts in Algiers, counting among his pupils Ksenia Milicevic, then director at the Ecole des Beaux-Arts of Oran.

From 1965 to 1982 he created models of the Algerian bank notes as well as many Algerians stamps.

He traveled to Vietnam in 1972 and in 1973 received a gold medal at the International Fair of Algiers for his work on the stand of the Ministry of Labour and Social Affairs.

From 1973 to 1978 Issiakhem returned to caricatures. In 1977 he ran the realization of a fresco at the Algiers Airport. The Ministry of Labour and Social Affairs published a brochure in Algiers which Kateb Yacine wrote the preface under the title Issiakhem's lynx Eyes and Americans, thirty-five years of hell of a painter. Issiakhem received in 1980 the first Golden Lion of Rome, of the UNESCO for African Art. He died on 1 December 1985 following a long illness.

== Tribute ==
On 17 June 2018, Google Doodle commemorated Issiakhem's 90th birthday.

== Bibliography ==
- Acheur Cheurfi, Bibliographical Dictionary of Algeria
- Médiène, Benamar. M'hamed Issiakhem : ma main au feu-- portrait à l'encre. Alger : Casbah Éditions, 2022 (ISBN 9789947623299)
