= Kateb al Shammary =

Saudi Arabian lawyer

Kateb al Shammary is a Saudi Arabian lawyer. His clients include a number of those who were, or remain, detained in Camp Delta in the American naval base at Guantanamo Bay, Cuba. One of his clients is Abdul Salam Gaithan Mureef Al Shehry, who was just 15 years old when captured.

Al Shammary has called on the United States to allow the detainees to face a fair trial:

“As the United States wants its prisoners in Iraq to be treated according to the Geneva Conventions, we also demand and expect that our prisoners (at Guantanamo Bay) would receive similar treatment,”
