= Amazigh Kateb =

Algerian singer and musician

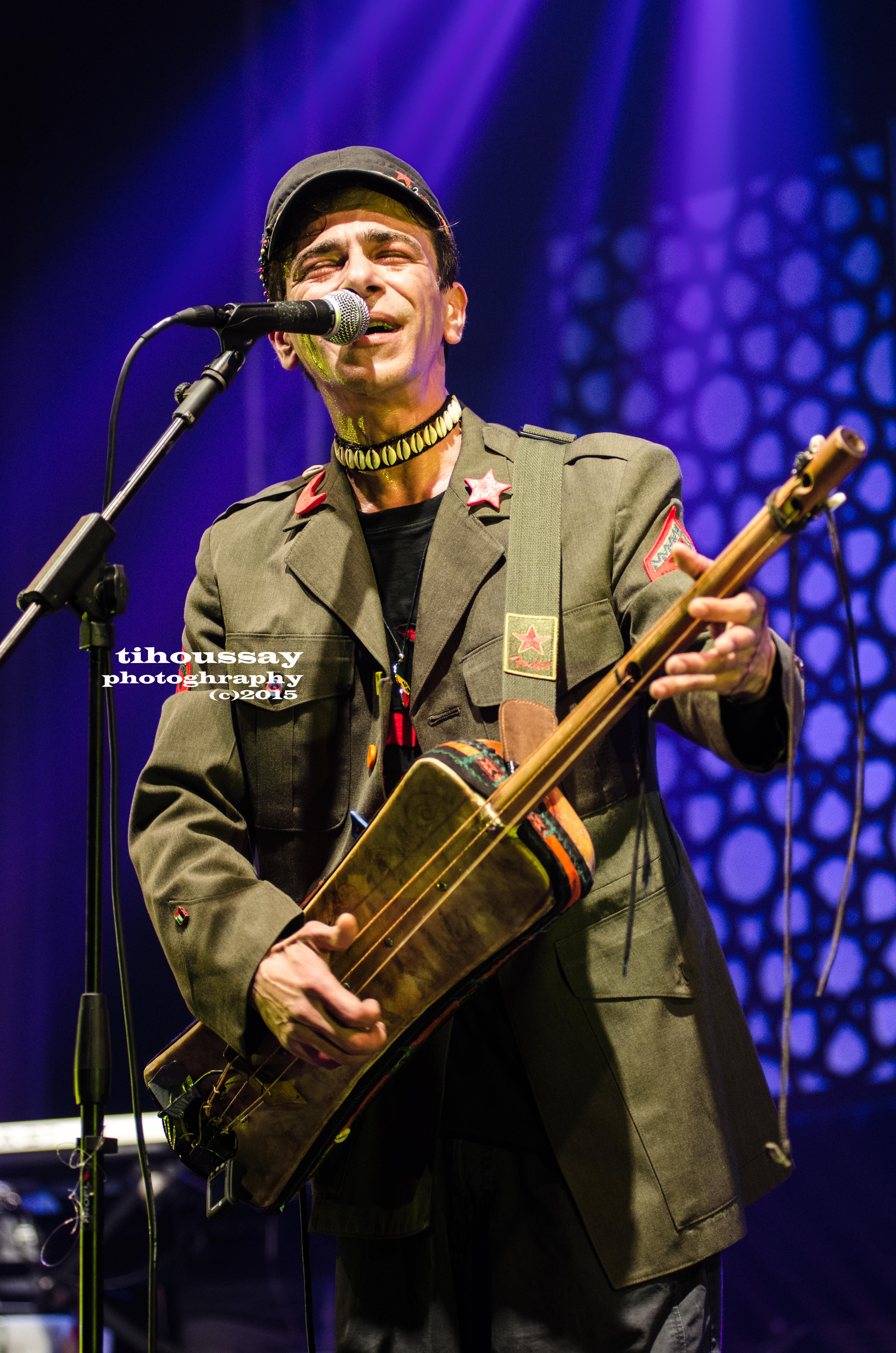

Background information
- Born: September 16, 1972 (age 53); Staouéli, Algeria
- Website: www.amazighkateb.com

Amazigh Kateb (born September 16, 1972) is an Algerian singer and musician.

== Early life ==
He emigrated to France in Grenoble in 1988, he was a member of the group Gnawa Diffusion (formed in 1992). He is the son of the writer Kateb Yacine, founder of the modern Algerian literature (Nedjma, the circle of reprisals ...). Amazigh Kateb left the band from its beginnings to launch a solo career since 2007. He announced the release of his first album for October 17, 2009.

== Discography ==
- 1993: [Légitime différence]
- 1997: [Algeria] (Melodie)
- 1999: [Bab el Oued – Kingston] (Musisoft)[2]
- 2002: [DZ Live] (Next Musique)
- 2003: [Souk System] (Warner)
- 2007: [Fucking Cowboys] (D'JAMAZ Production)
- 2009: [Marchez noir]
