= Nedjma =

1956 novel by Kateb Yacine

- Éditions Points paperback cover
- Author: Kateb Yacine
- Language: French
- Subjects: French Algeria, colonialism
- Publication date: 1956
- Publication place: Algeria
- Media type: Print (hardback and paperback)

Nedjma is a novel written by Kateb Yacine and published in 1956. It tells the story of four young men (Mustapha, Lakhdar, Rachid, Mourad) who fall in love with Nedjma, daughter of an Algerian and a French woman, during the French colonization of Algeria. It is set in the east of Algeria, with most of the action taking place in the region around Constantine and Annaba (referred to by its French name, Bône, in the text).

== Plot summary ==
Although published in 1956, thus during the Algerian War of Independence which began in November 1954, it was largely written between 1947 and 1953, and the novel's political dimension applies specifically to this period rather than to the war itself. The central action of the novel takes place during the period following the nationalist demonstrations of 8 May 1945, which included the Sétif massacre. Two of the characters in the novel, Lakhdar and Mustapha, were arrested, imprisoned and tortured following these demonstrations. The novel begins in the wake of the period of upheavals which followed the demonstrations. The four male characters have found work on a building site, and one of them, Lakhdar, has been imprisoned following an altercation with M. Ernest, their (French) boss - an altercation which, however, due to the complex temporal structure of the novel, will not be related until later in the text. Shortly after this, still in the first part of the novel, another of the characters, Mourad, is involved in a brawl at a wedding which results in his being responsible for the death of M. Ricard, another French entrepreneur. This event causes the other characters to disperse, and from this point the novel changes in style and begins to recount their separate histories, jumping around considerably in its chronology. Each of the four male characters has a connection to, and is attracted to, Nedjma, who is the same age as the male characters but already (unhappily) married. Although based on a real person, with whom Yacine had a relationship, Nedjma (who rarely speaks in the novel and whose character is not developed) has frequently been identified with Algeria, "la femme-patrie". The novel also evokes the history of the characters' tribe, the Keblout, and of Abdelkader's original resistance to French colonisation.

== Writing style ==
Largely eschewing a simple 'realist' style, and written in a highly sophisticated French which at times passes into poetry, Nedjma has been compared stylistically with contemporary French works of the Nouveau Roman period, although Charles Bonn notes that William Faulkner was a much greater influence on Yacine than any of the Nouveau Roman writers. It has also been read as a response to Albert Camus' famous novel L'Etranger which centres on the apparently irrational murder of an Algerian Arab by a French Pied-Noir.
