= Kateb Yacine =

Algerian writer (1929–1989)

Kateb Yacine كاتب ياسين
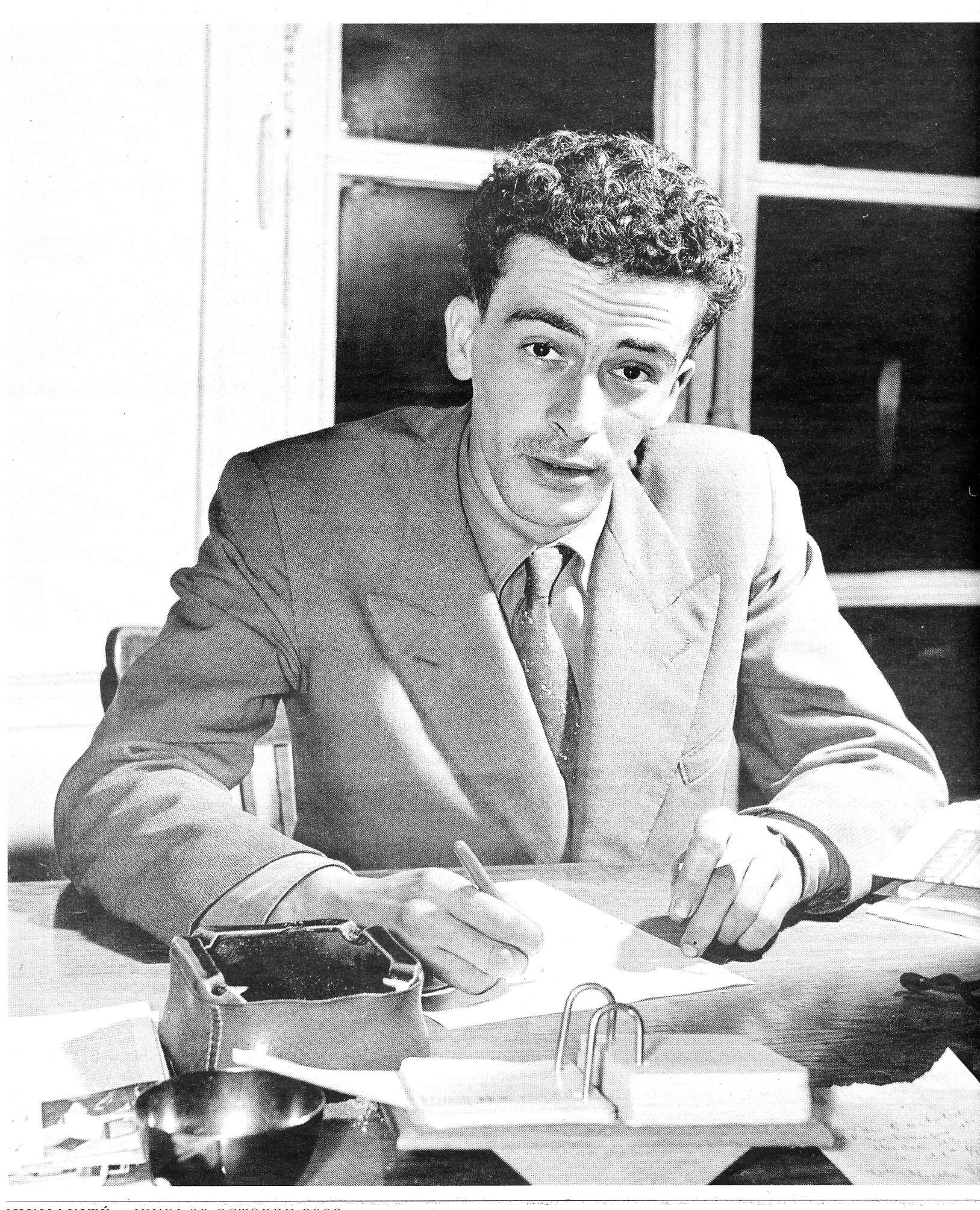
- Born: Kateb Yacine; 2 August 1929; Constantine, Algeria
- Died: 28 October 1989 (aged 60); Grenoble, France
- Resting place: El Alia Cemetery
- Occupations: novelist, essayist, activist
- Children: Amazigh Kateb
- Writing career
- Language: French, Arabic
- Period: 1940–1989
- Notable works: Nedjma, Le Polygone étoilé
- Notable awards: the Grand Prix National des Lettres in France, 1987

Kateb Yacine (Arabic pronunciation: [kæːtb jæːsiːn]; 2 August 1929 or 6 August 1929 – 28 October 1989) was an Algerian writer notable for his novels and plays, both in French and Algerian Arabic, and his advocacy of the Berber cause.

== Biography ==
Kateb Yacine was officially born on 6 August 1929 in Constantine, though it is likely that his birth occurred four days earlier. Although his birth name is Yacine Kateb, he once said that he was so used to hearing his teachers calling out names with the last name first that he adopted Kateb Yacine as a pen name.

He was born into a scholarly maraboutic Chaoui Berber family from the modern Sedrata, in wilaya of Souk Ahras (in the Aurès region). His maternal grandfather was the 'bach adel', or deputy judge of the qadi in Condé Smendou (Zirout Youcef). His father was a lawyer, and the family followed him through his various assignments in different parts of the country. Young Kateb (which means 'writer'), attended the Sedrata Quran school in 1937, then in 1938 the French school in Lafayette (Bougaa) in Little Kabylie, where the family had moved. In 1941 he enrolled in the colonial 'collège' (secondary school) of Setif as a boarder.

Kateb Yacine was in his third year of collège when the demonstrations of 8 May 1945 occurred. He participated in these demonstrations that ended with the massacre of between six and eight (according to nationalists forty-five) thousand Algerians by the French army and police in the Sétif and Guelma massacre. Three days later he was placed under arrest and imprisoned for two months. From that point on he became a partisan for the nationalist cause. Expelled from secondary school, watching his mother's psychological health decline, passing through a period of dejection and being immersed in the writings of Lautréamont and Baudelaire, his father sent him to the high school in Bône (Annaba). There he met 'Nedjma' ('the star'), an 'already married cousin' with whom he lived for 'maybe eight months', as he later acknowledged.

While living with Nedjma he published his first collection of poetry in 1946. He had already become 'politicized' and started giving lectures under the auspices of the Algerian People's Party, 'the great nationalist party of the masses'. Yacine went to Paris in 1947, "into the lion's den" as he put it.

In May 1947, he joined the Algerian Communist Party and gave a lecture in the 'Salle des Sociétés savantes' on emir Abd al-Qadir. During a second visit to France the following year he published 'Nedjma ou le Poème du Couteau' (a hint of what was to follow) in the revue 'Le Mercure de France'. He was a journalist at the daily 'Alger Républicain' between 1949 and 1951.

After his father's death in 1950, Yacine worked as a longshoreman in Algiers. He returned to Paris where he would stay until 1959. During this period in Paris he worked with Malek Haddad, developed a relationship with M'hamed Issiakhem, and in 1954, spoke extensively with Bertold Brecht. In 1954, the revue Esprit published Yacine's play 'Le cadavre encerclé', which was staged by Jean-Marie Serreau but was banned in France.

'Nedjma' was published in 1956 (and Kateb would not forget the editor's comment: "This is too complicated. In Algeria you've got such pretty sheep, why don't you talk about your sheep?"). During the Algerian War of Independence, Yacine was forced to travel abroad for a long time due to the harassment he faced from the DST. He lived in numerous places, subsisting as a guest writer or working various odd jobs in France, Belgium, Germany, Italy, Yugoslavia and the USSR.

After a stay in Cairo, Yacine returned again to Algeria in 1962, shortly after the independence celebrations. He resumed writing for 'Alger Républicain' but traveled frequently between 1963 and 1967 to Moscow, France and Germany. 'La Femme sauvage', which he had written between 1954 and 1959, was performed in Paris in 1963. 'Les Ancêtres redoublent de férocité' was staged in 1967. 'La Poudre d'intelligence' was also staged in Paris in 1967 and an Algerian Arabic version in Algiers in 1969. In 1964 Yacine published six essays on 'our brothers the Indians' in 'Alger Républicain' and recounted his meeting with Jean-Paul Sartre while his mother was being committed to the psychiatric hospital in Blida ('La Rose de Blida', in 'Révolution Africaine', July 1965). He left for Vietnam in 1967, completely abandoning the novel and wrote 'L'Homme aux sandales de caoutchouc', a play celebrating Ho Chi Minh and the Vietnamese struggle against imperialism, that was published, performed and translated into Arabic in 1970.

The same year Yacine returned to make a more permanent home in Algeria. During this period he had a significant change in philosophy: he refused to continue writing in French, and instead began working on popular theatre, epics and satires, performed in dialectal Arabic. Beginning this work with the theatre company 'Théatre de la Mer' from Bab El Oued in 1971, sponsored by the Ministère du Travail et des Affaires Sociales, Kateb traveled all over Algeria for five years, putting on plays for an audience of workers, farmers and students.

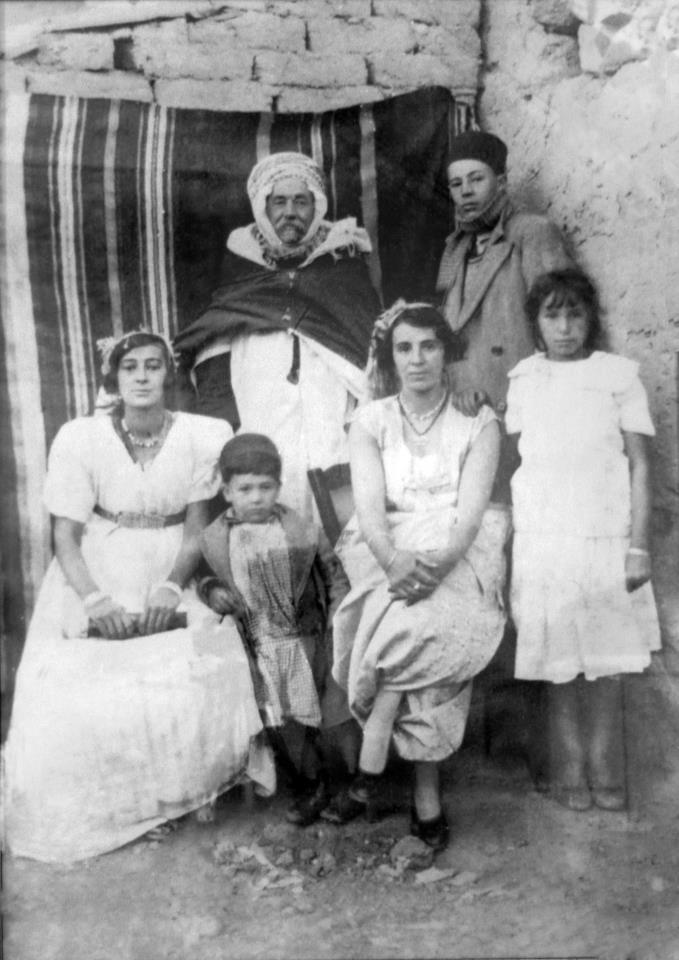
The Kateb family, with Yacine sitting in the front between his two sisters

Between 1972 and 1975 Kateb went with on tour performing the plays 'Mohamed prends ta valise' and 'La Guerre de deux mille ans' to France and to the German Democratic Republic. The Algerian government in Sidi Bel Abbès more or less sentenced him to direct the city's regional theatre as a kind of exile. Having been forbidden to appear on television, Yacine staged his plays in schools or businesses. He was often criticized for his emphasis on Berber tradition and the 'Tamazight' language, as well as for his liberal positions on issues of gender equality such as his position against women being required to wear a headscarf.

In 1986 Kateb Yacine circulated an excerpt of a play about Nelson Mandela, and in 1987 he received the Grand prix national des Lettres in France.

In 1988 the Avignon Festival staged 'Le Bourgeois sans culotte ou le spectre du parc Monceau', a play about Robespierre that Yacine wrote at the request of the Arras Cultural Center for the bicentennial commemoration of the French Revolution. Yacine settled in Verscheny in Drôme, traveled often to the United States and continued to make frequent trips to Algeria. At his death he left an unfinished work on the Algerian riots of October 1988. In 2003 his works were admitted to the Comédie-Française.

Taught in the language of the colonizer, Kateb Yacine considered the French language the Algerians' spoil of the war for independence. He declared in 1966 that "La Francophonie is a neocolonial political machine, which only perpetuates our alienation, but the usage of the French language does not mean that one is an agent of a foreign power, and I write in French to tell the French that I am not French". Trilingual, Kateb Yacine also wrote and supervised the translation of his texts into the Berber language. His work manifests his multicultural country's search for identity and the aspirations of its people.

Kateb Yacine is the father of three children, Hans, Nadia and Amazigh Kateb, singer for the band Gnawa Diffusion.

== Bibliography ==
=== Books by Kateb ===
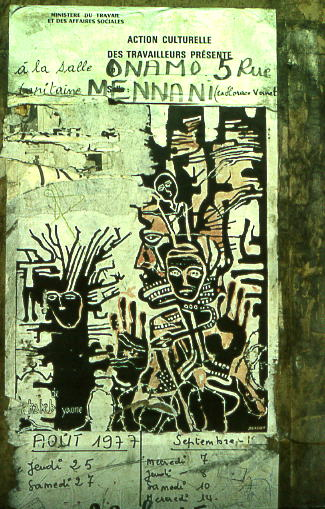
Poster for a Kateb Yacine Play in Algiers, by M'hamed Issiakhem

- Soliloques, poems, Bône, Ancienne imprimerie Thomas, 1946. Reprint (with an introduction by Kateb Yacine), Algeria, Bouchène, 1991, 64 pages.
- Abdelkader et l'indépendance algérienne, Algeria, En Nahda, 1948, 47 pages.
- Nedjma, novel, Paris, Editions du Seuil, 1956, 256 pages. (English translation by Richard Howard, Charlottesville: University Press of Virginia, 1991, ISBN 0-8139-1312-8 and ISBN 0-8139-1313-6 [paperback])
- Le Cercle des représailles, play, Paris, Editions du Euil, 1959, 169 pages [contains Le Cadavre encerclé, La Poudre d'intelligence, Les Ancêtres redoublent de férocité, and Le Vautour, introduction by Edouard Glissant: Le Chant profond de Kateb Yacine].
- Le Polygone étoilé, novel, Paris, Editions du Seuil, 1966, 182 pages.
- Les Ancêtres redoublent de férocité, [with a new ending], Paris, collection TNP, 1967.
- L'Homme aux sandales de caoutchouc, tribute to Vietnam and leader Ho Chi Minh, play, Paris, Editions du Seuil, 1970, 288 pages.
- Boucherie de l'espérance, plays, [four plays, including Mohammed prends ta valise, 1971, and Le Bourgeois sans culotte], Paris, Editions du Seuil, 1999, 570 pages. ISBN 2-02-033905-6
- L'Œuvre en fragments, Inédits littéraires et textes retrouvés, rassemblés et présentés by Jacqueline Arnaud, Paris, Sindbad 1986, 448 pages (ISBN 2-7274-0129-9).
- Le Poète comme un boxeur, interviews 1958–1989, Paris, Editions du Seuil, 1994. ISBN 2-02-022193-4
- Minuit passé de douze heures, journalism, 1947–1989, textes réunis par Amazigh Kateb, Paris, Editions du Seuil, 1999, 360 pages. ISBN 2-02-038730-1
- Parce que c'est une femme, introduction by Zebeïda Chergui, play, [including an interview with Kateb Yacine by El Hanar Benali, 1972, La Kahina ou Dilhya; Saout Ennissa, 1972; La Voix des femmes et Louise Michel et la Nouvelle Calédonie], Paris, Editions des Femmes, 2004, 174 pages.

=== Introductions and prefaces ===
- Les Fruits de la colère, introduction to Aît Djaffar, Complainte de la petite Yasmina
- Les mille et une nuit de la révolution, introduction to Abdelhamid Benzine, La Plaine et la montagne
- Les Ancêtres redoublent de férocité, introduction to Tassadit Yacine, "Lounis Aït Menguellet songs, in Berber and French, Paris, La Découverte, 1989; Alger Bouchène/Awal, 1990 [ Kateb Yacine's final work, written for Tassadit Yacine on 29 September 1989, one month before he died].

== On Kateb Yacine ==
- Hommage à Kateb Yacine [with a detailed bibliography by Jacqueline Arnaud], Kalim n° 7, Algeria, Office des Publications Universitaires, 1987, 264 pages.
- Ghania Khelifi, Kateb Yacine, Eclats et poèmes, [chronology and many documents], Algeria, Enag Editions, 1990, 136 pages.
- Kateb Yacine, Eclats de mémoire, documents réunis par Olivier Corpet, Albert Dichy et Mireille Djaider, Editions de l'IMEC, 1994, 80 pages (ISBN 2-908295-20-2).
- Autréaux, Patrick, The Revolution Amid the Revolution, Sublunary Editions, 2024
