= Yiannis Katevas =

Yiannis Katevas Γιάννης Κατέβας
- Born: Yiannis Katevas; Greek: Γιάννης Κατέβας; 8 October 1950 (age 75); Komotini, Greece
- Genres: Laïko
- Occupation: Musician
- Instruments: vocals, guitar

Yiannis Katevas (Greek: Γιάννης Κατέβας), born 8 October 1950) is a Greek singer and songwriter. He released fourteen full-length studio albums, mostly on Columbia Records and Minos Records.

He began his career at the young age of 16 as vocalist and lead guitarist of the pop group "The Beatniks". Some time later in the Folk genre, Yiannis was mentored by the renowned composer Giorgos Mitsakis who ushered him through the doors of the guarded music industry and wrote his first 2 songs for Columbia Records.

Since that time he has released fourteen full-length albums, many of which have gone gold giving us hit singles such as: Na m' Agapas Tora - Ta Giasemakia sou - An Ginotane - An Mou Harisoun - Pios - Me Syglonizis - Ne gia Sena Ne - Yia sou Ellada and too many more to mention.

Apart from singing he also plays guitar and has written the majority of the music in his recordings. The CDs "Yia sou Ellada" and "Kai Horevi H Ellada" are his latest releases in the folklore genre and feature medleys from all regions of Greece.

== Discography ==
=== Studio albums ===
He released the following studio albums:

- Και Αύριο και Πάντα (Columbia, 1976)
- Τραγούδια Αγάπης (Columbia, 1977)
- Τα Γιασεμάκια σου (Columbia, 1979)
- Τα Ωραία του Κατέβα (Columbia, 1980)
- Κάτι Παραπάνω (Minos, 1980)
- Να Μ΄Αγαπάς Τώρα (Minos, 1981)
- Που Θα Πας (Minos, 1983)
- Ναι για Σένα, Ναι (Minos, 1985)
- 10 Χρόνια Τραγούδια (Minos, 1987)
- Με Συγκλονίζεις (Minos, 1989)
- Κι Όμως σ’ Αγαπώ (Spot Music, 1992)
- Οι Μεγάλες Επιτυχίες του (Minos-EMI, 1995)
- Γειά σου Ελλάδα (Legend, 2003)
- Και Χορεύει η Ελλάδα (Legend, 2006)
