= Idir (singer) =

Algerian singer (1945–2020)

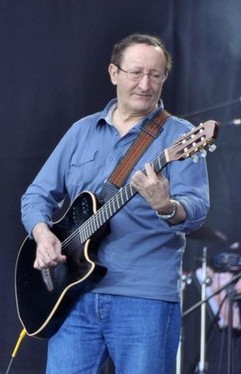
- Idir performing in 2011

Background information
- Also known as: Idir
- Born: Hamid Cheriet; 25 October 1945; Aït Yenni, French Algeria
- Died: 2 May 2020 (aged 74) Paris, France
- Genres: Traditional Kabyle music, pop, folk, fusion
- Occupations: Singer; songwriter; record producer; musician
- Instruments: Vocals, guitar, flute, percussions
- Years active: 1976–2020
- Website: idir-officiel.fr

Hamid Cheriet (Kabyle: Ḥamid Ceryat; 25 October 1945 – 2 May 2020), better known by his stage name Idir, was an Algerian Kabyle singer-songwriter and musician. Referred to as the "King of Amazigh music", he is regarded as one of the most significant modern day figures in Algerian and Amazigh culture, history, and struggle.

Initially training to be a geologist, his interest for music was piqued when he was called to sing on state radio as a late substitute. After finishing his compulsory military service, he moved to France in 1975 and embarked on his career in music. Idir took a hiatus during the 1980s before returning in 1993. He was a passionate advocate of the Kabyle and Berber cultures.

== Early life and career ==
Idir was born in Aït Lahcene, Aït Yenni, Tizi Ouzou Province (part of French Algeria at the time), on 25 October 1945. He originally studied to become a geologist and worked at an oil and gas field. In 1973, he was asked to be a late substitute for Nouara on Radio Algeria. He sang "A Vava Inouva", a lullaby that incorporated the "rich oral traditions" of his Berber culture. Although the song became popular, both in Algeria and abroad, Idir did not learn about this until after he finished his military conscription. In 1975, he left for France to begin working on his debut album, also titled A Vava Inouva. The title track was translated into seven languages and became a major success. Idir would later comment how "the song had chosen [him]". After releasing the album Ay Arrac Nneɣ, he took a break from writing music throughout the 1980s.

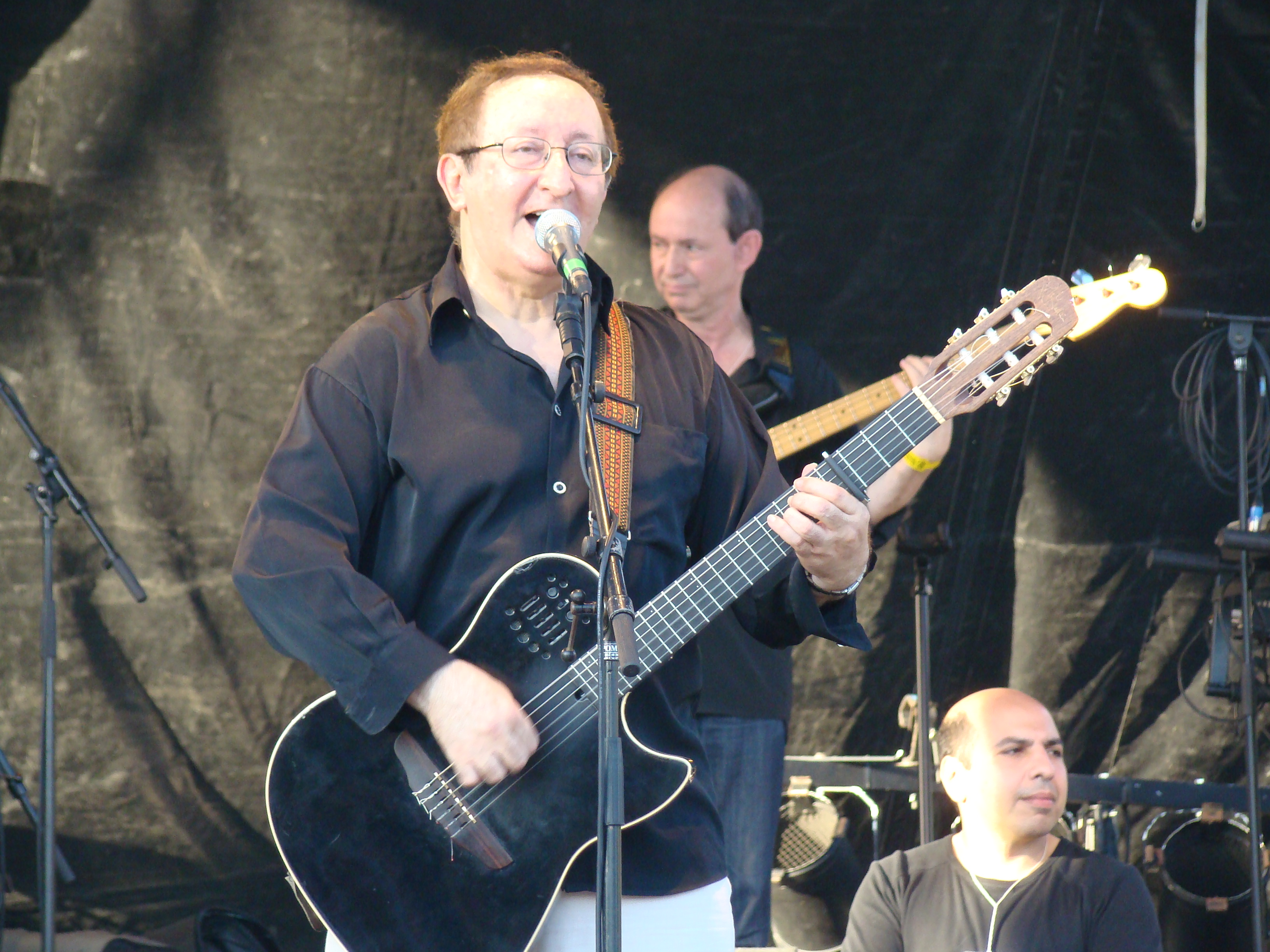
Idir performing in Bondy, France, in 2008

Idir re-entered the music industry in 1993 when he released the album Les Chasseurs de Lumières ("The Light Hunters"). He became known as an ardent advocate of the Kabyle and Berber cultures. In 1995, he performed together with fellow Berber Lounès Matoub, who was murdered three years later. His 1999 album, Identités, featured him singing with Manu Chao, Dan Ar Braz, Maxime Le Forestier, Gnawa Diffusion, Zebda, Gilles Servat, Geoffrey Oryema, and the Berber National Orchestra. It was ultimately a widespread success.

Idir's release of the album La France des Couleurs ("France of Colors") coincided with the 2007 French presidential election, in which Idir championed multiculturalism and immigration. He released his final album, Ici et Ailleurs ("Here and Elsewhere") in 2017. The following year, he returned to his native Algeria after being away for 38 years, since 1980. He held a concert there in support of the Algerian protests that eventually led to the resignation of President Abdelaziz Bouteflika.

== Death ==
Idir died on 2 May 2020 in Paris at age 74. He had been suffering from pulmonary fibrosis and was hospitalized two days before his death. News of his death was first announced on his official Facebook page, apparently posted by his children. A message of condolence conveyed by Abdelmadjid Tebboune, the President of Algeria, via Twitter praised Idir as "an icon of Algerian art" and stated that the country had "lost one of its monuments".

== Identity and activism ==
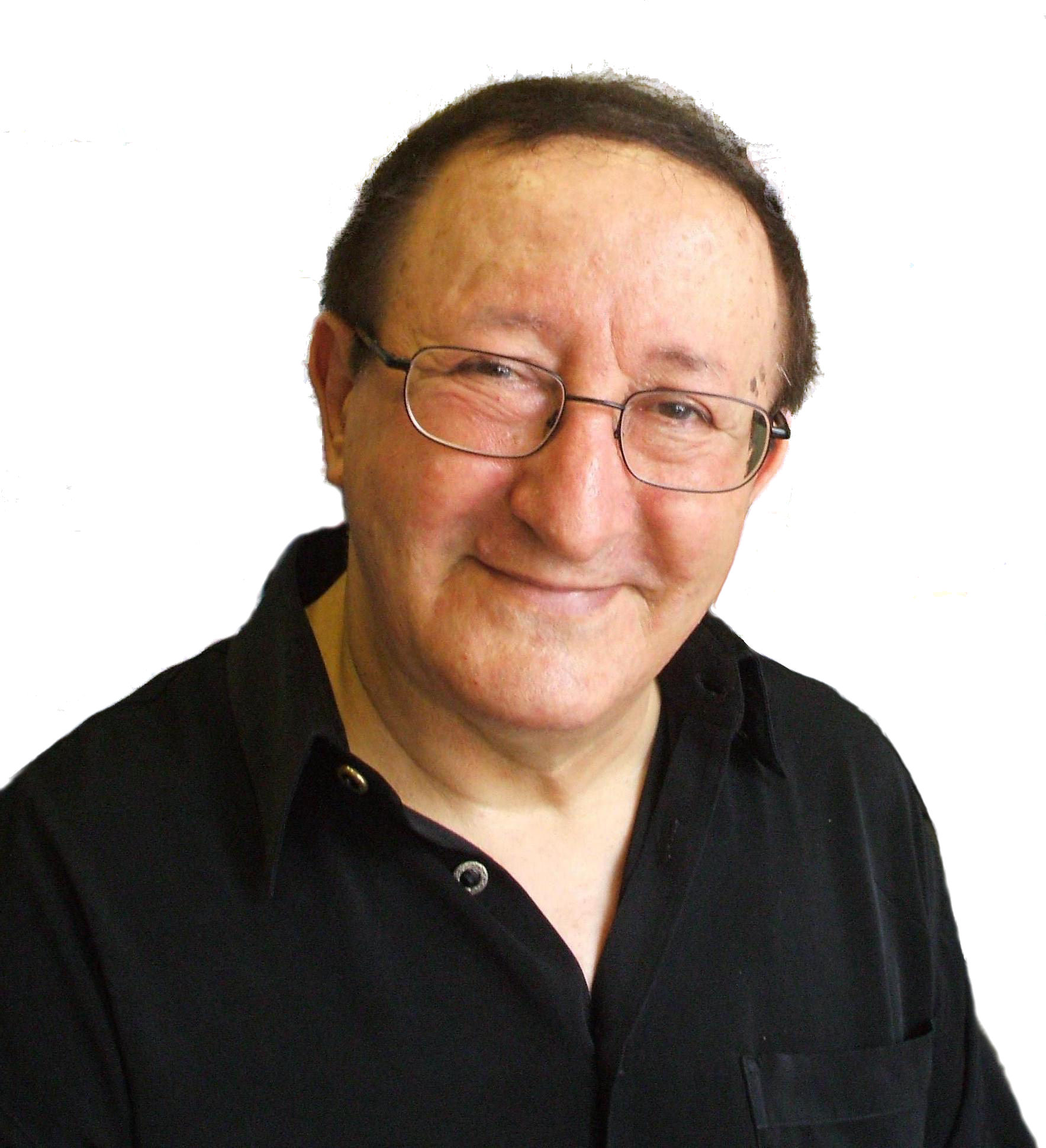

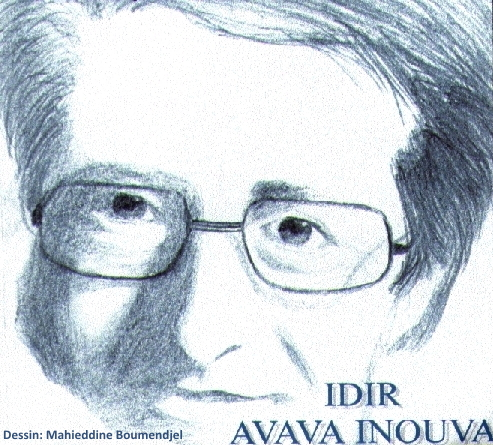
IDIR. Hamid CHERIET

Idir participated in many concerts supporting different causes. For example, on 22 June 1995, more than 6,000 people attended a concert for peace, freedom, and tolerance performed by him and his friend, singer Khaled, initiators of the association "La France, la Vie" ("France and Life"). Idir also took part in the concert in memory of Lounès Matoub, the Kabyle singer who was assassinated in 1998.

In 2001, Idir defended his national identity once again at "Le Zénith" in Paris at the "21st Berber Spring", a celebration of Berber culture. On 8 July that year, he organised a special fund-raising concert to support the population in Kabylie, at a time when anti-government riots were taking place in the predominantly-Berber region. Idir was joined by a number of stars and thousands of French fans who turned out to "Le Zénith" to support the population in Kabylie.

== Discography ==
=== Albums ===
Year	Album	Chart peak FR
1976	A Vava Inouva	
1979	Ay arrac nneɣ (Ay Arrac Negh)	
1980	Récital à l'Olympia	
1986	Le petit village, Les Enfants De Tiddukla	
1987	Mliyi avec Ali Tiddukla	
1991	A Vava Inouva	
1993	Les chasseurs de lumières	
1999	Identités	23
2002	Deux rives, un rêve	
2005	Entre scènes et terres (live album)	125
2007	La France des couleurs	22
2013	Idir	43
2017	Ici et ailleurs	12

=== Singles ===
Year	Singles	Chart peak FR	Album
2002	"Pourquoi cette pluie?"	64	Deux rives, un rêve
2016	"A Vava Inouva"	131	

== Sources ==
- Idir – Interview & Concert, Al Hoceima 2010
- Idir Concert in Festival Twiza, tanger
- Idir Discography
- Idir Ssendu
- Idir Rif Cultural day ni ifrane, By Agraw
- Idir’s Rainbow Nation: Album of rap and R&B duets (New Album)
