= Among Brothers =

Studio album by Abderrahmane Abdelli
- Released: 2003
- Genre: World
- Length: 64:00
- Label: Real World
- Producer: Thierry Van Roy

Abderrahmane Abdelli chronology
Au-delà de Gibraltar (2000)	Among Brothers (2003)	Destiny (2011)

Professional ratings
Review scores
Source	Rating
AllMusic	4/5 stars

Among Brothers is a World album released in 2003 by Algerian composer and singer-songwriter Abderrahmane Abdelli. The album was released by Real World Records.

== Track listing ==
1. "Amazine Introduction" – 1:34
2. "Amazine (Moonlight)" – 6:01
3. "Itij Introduction" – 1:14
4. "Itij (The Sun)" – 6:46
5. "Kif-kif (Either Way)" – 3:15
6. "Asiram (Hope)" – 4:30
7. "Svar (Patience)" – 4:09
8. "Adhou Introduction" – 1:56
9. "Adhou (The Wind)" – 1:44
10. "Inas (The Message)" – 6:53
11. "Tharguith (The Dream)" – 5:21
12. "Ayen (Why?)" – 4:36
13. "Ayema-yema (O My Mother)" – 6:43
14. "Thamziw Introduction" – 3:06
15. "Thamziw (My Youth)" – 3:04

== Personnel ==
THE MUSICIANS

- Abdelli (Algeria) - lead vocal; mandola
- Thierry Van Roy (Belgium) - e-bow guitars; keyboards
- Assedine Jazouli (Morocco) - darbukka; bendir; taarija; bells; tabla; tar (percussion); daf; karkabou
- Abdelmagid 'Mgidou' Makrai Lamanti (Morocco) - violin; percussion
- Said 'El Asfour' Mohammed Najib (Tunisia) - nay
- Luis Leiva Alquinta (Chile) - bombo; cajon; bells; Maracas; udu; guiro; reco-reco; triangle
- Carlos Diaz (Argentina) - Spanish guitar
- Lahcen Bourgha (Morocco) - ajouj; wooden karkabou

In Cape Verde:

- Ulysses Santos - lead acoustic guitar; Portuguese guitar; cavaquino
- Aurelio Santos - cavaquino
- Bitori - diatonic accordion
- Totovares - acoustic guitar
- Halder - ferrinio
- Aderito - additional guitar

In Azerbaijan:

- Möhlet Müslümov - târ
- Fahraddin Dadashov - kemantcha
- Faïg Alibalayev - garmon
- Elshad Jabbarov - balaban; clarinet; flute
- Malahat Aliyeva - kanun
- Farhad Rahimov - nagara; zarb
- Oktaj - gosha nagara
- Jawad Smaili - Iranian nay

In Burkina Faso: The drum section of Farafina

- Salif Koné - bara
- Adolphe Kinda - djembe
- Bakhari Traoré - bara
- Souleymane 'Mani' Sanou - doumdouba; shekere
