= Music of Algeria =

Algerian music is virtually synonymous with Raï among foreigners; the musical genre has achieved great popularity in North Africa and Europe, especially Morocco, Tunisia, France, and Spain, among others. For several centuries, Algerian music was dominated by styles inherited from Al-Andalus, eventually forming a unique North African twist on these poetic forms. Algerian music came to include suites called nuubaat (singular nuuba). Later derivatives include rabaab and hawzii.

== Genres ==
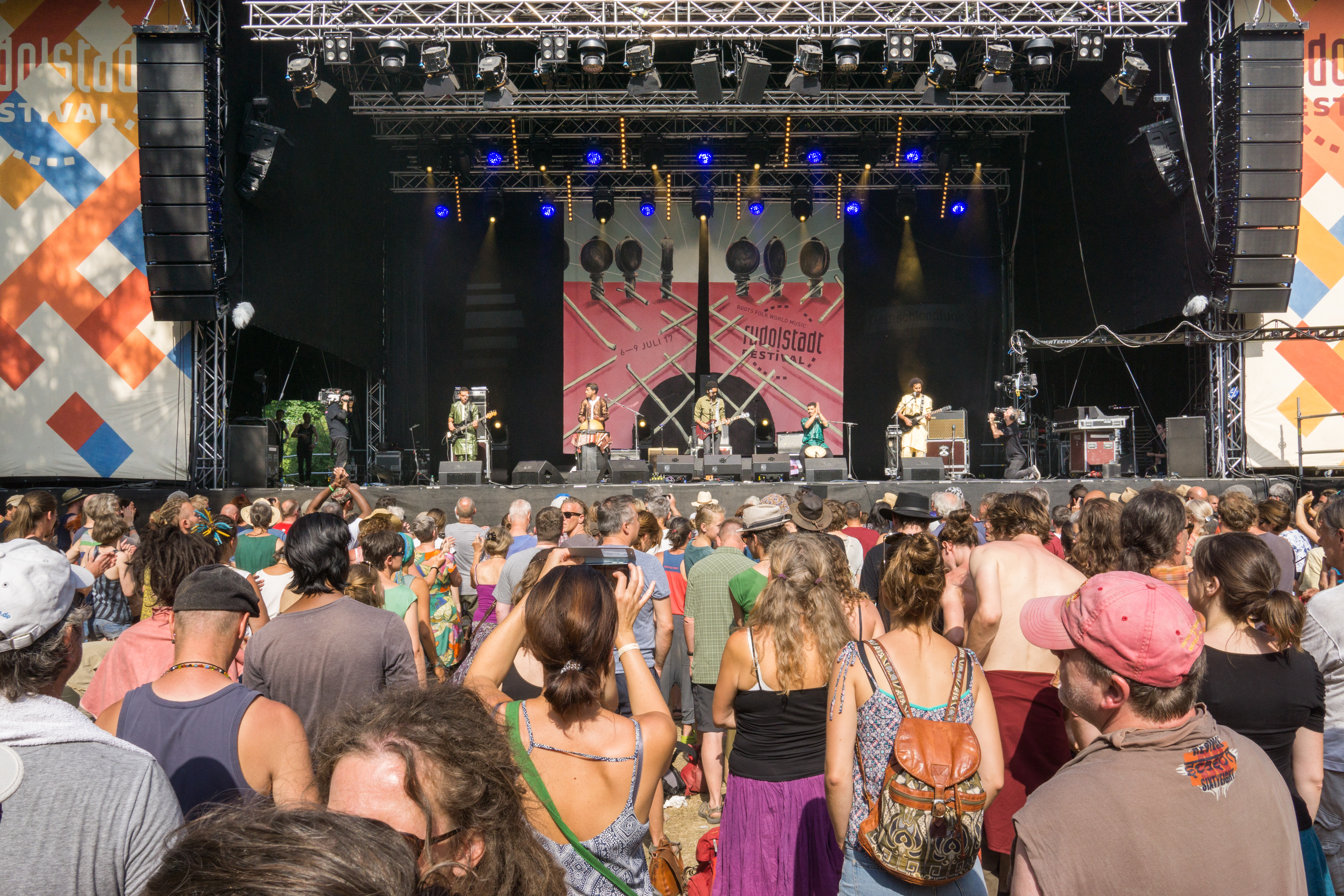
Imarhan, Tuareg desert rock quintet

Music in Algeria offers a rich diversity of genre: popular music (Chaabi), various genres of Andalusian classical music such as Sana'a, Gharnati music, Ma'luf, as well as classical Arabic, Bedouin, Berber music (Staifi, Raï, Kabyle, Shawi, Tuareg, Gnawa, etc.),

Andalusian music is particularly well developed in Algeria, and is considered the most sophisticated by musical scholars - there exist three schools, the greatest number in the Maghreb region, and the performers invited to festivals across the Maghreb are usually of Algerian origin. Famous performers include Beihdja Rahal, Brahim Hadj Kacem, Nouri Koufi and Leila Borsali.

Haouzi music is another style of Algerian music. It took the melodies of Andalusian music and modernized them. Haouzi music is most often played at weddings and ceremonies.

Khaled known as Cheb Khaled, is considered as the King of Rai music, has achieved international fame, as Rai music is very popular in Algeria, Morocco France, Tunisia, Turkey, Libya, and Egypt. Staifi is a genre of music which began in Eu-eulma City, and is mostly played at weddings and celebrations, primarily featuring lyrics which symbolize purity and love.

Chaabi refers to a style of recent urban popular music, inherited from the older Andalusian repertoire, of which the best known performer was El Hajj Muhammad El Anka, considered to be the Grand Master of Andalusian classical music. True styles of folk music include hofii, a form of female vocal music, and zindalii, from Constantine.

Raï is a creative outlet to express love and romance; a mix between Western music and Bedouin music.

Ma'luf is a genre of Andalusian classical music from Constantine which has survived because of the efforts of the Tunisian government and a few private individuals. Malouf is still performed in public, especially at weddings and circumcision ceremonies, though recordings are relatively rare.

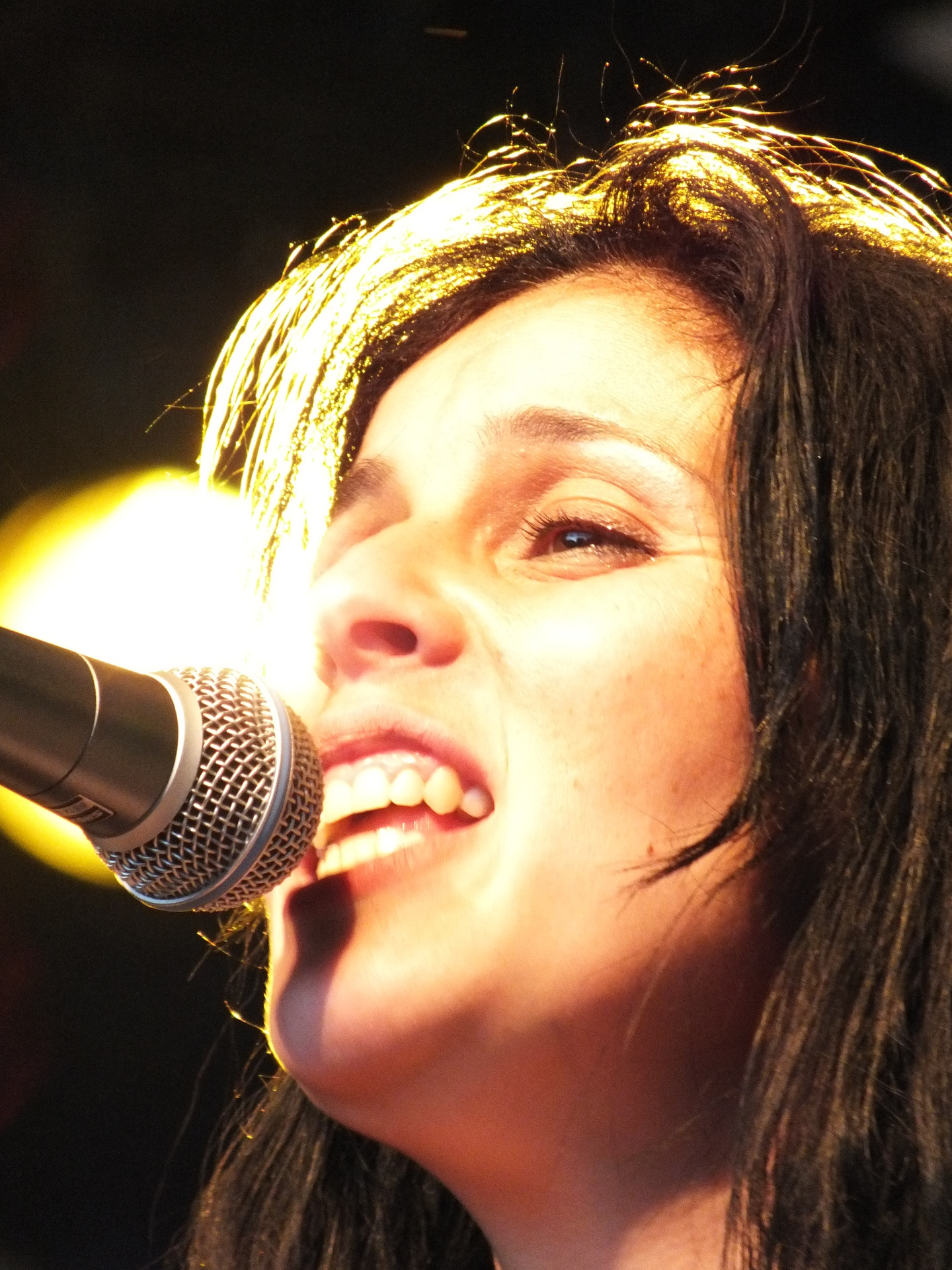
Souad Massi

== Important musicians ==
See: List of Algerian musicians

== See also ==
- Arabic music
- Berber music

== Bibliography ==
- Morgan, Andy. "Music Under Fire". 2000. In Broughton, Simon and Ellingham, Mark with McConnachie, James and Duane, Orla (Ed.), World Music, Vol. 1: Africa, Europe and the Middle East, pp 413–424. Rough Guides Ltd, Penguin Books. ISBN 1-85828-636-0
- Morgan, Andy. "Bards of Immigritude". 2000. In Broughton, Simon and Ellingham, Mark with McConnachie, James and Duane, Orla (Ed.), World Music, Vol. 1: Africa, Europe and the Middle East, pp 425–427. Rough Guides Ltd, Penguin Books. ISBN 1-85828-636-0
- La Chanson de l'exil; les voix natales (1939–1969), Rachid Mokhtari, Alger, Casbah Éditions, 2001
- Chants kabyles de la guerre d'indépendance, Mehenna Mahfoufi, Éditions Séguier, 2002.
- Les grands maîtres algériens du cha’bi et du hawzi, diwan arabe-kabyle, textes transcrits, traduits et annotés sous la direction de Rachid Aous, Éditions El Ouns/Unesco, Paris, 1996.
- Bezza Mazouzi La musique algérienne et la question raï, Richard-Masse, Paris, 1990.
