= Karim Tizouiar =

Algerian singer-songwriter (1963–2023)

- Karim Tizuyar
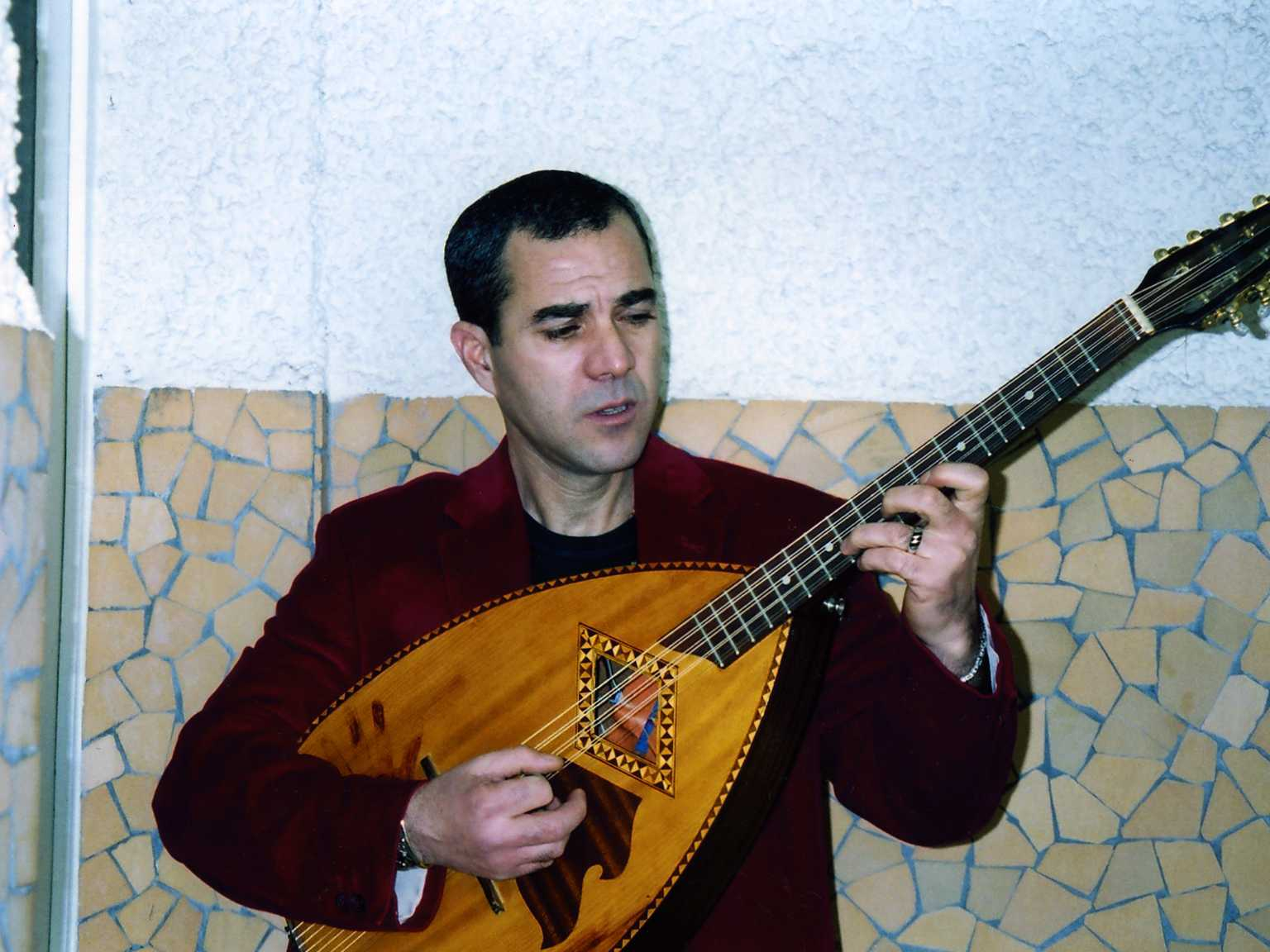
- Born: 2 March 1963; Sidi M'Hamed, Algiers Province, Algeria
- Died: 28 May 2023 (aged 60); France
- Other names: Karim T Karim
- Occupation: Singer-songwriter

Karim Tizouiar (Kabyle: Karim Tizuyar; 2 March 1963 – 28 May 2023), also known as Karim T or just Karim, was an Algerian singer-songwriter, composer and mandolinist.

== Life and career ==
Born in Sidi M'Hamed, Tizouiar grew up in Tala Tazert, a village in Béjaïa Province, where he received his early musical education. At 20 he moved to Paris, where in 1982 he started his professional career entering the Kabyle ensemble Agraw as a mandolinist, then replacing Takfarinas as lead vocalist in 1985. Following the success of the band's song Uliw yeduqqus he made his solo debut in 1987, with the album Ay Aguitar ("Oh Guitar"). Among his best known compositions are the title track "Ay Aguitar", "Achehal Insher I Yetran" and "Rju-yi".

Suffering from a debilitating illness which led him to announce his premature retirement in 2011, Tizouiar died on 28 May 2023, at the age of 60.

== Discography ==
=== Albums ===
- 1985 : Lexmis d lǧemεa (with Agraw)
- 1987 : Ay agiṭar
- 1989 : Attan truḥ
- 1994 : Weḥdi weḥdi
- 2002 : Iruḥ zzhu
- 2004 : Ma nettraju
- 2010 : Lǧawi
- 2019 : Mirak

=== Singles ===
- 1990 : Attan a marwella
- 2022 : A tin iɣaben
- 2022 : El courage
