= Abderrahmane Abdelli =

Algerian author, composer and singer-songwriter (born 1958)

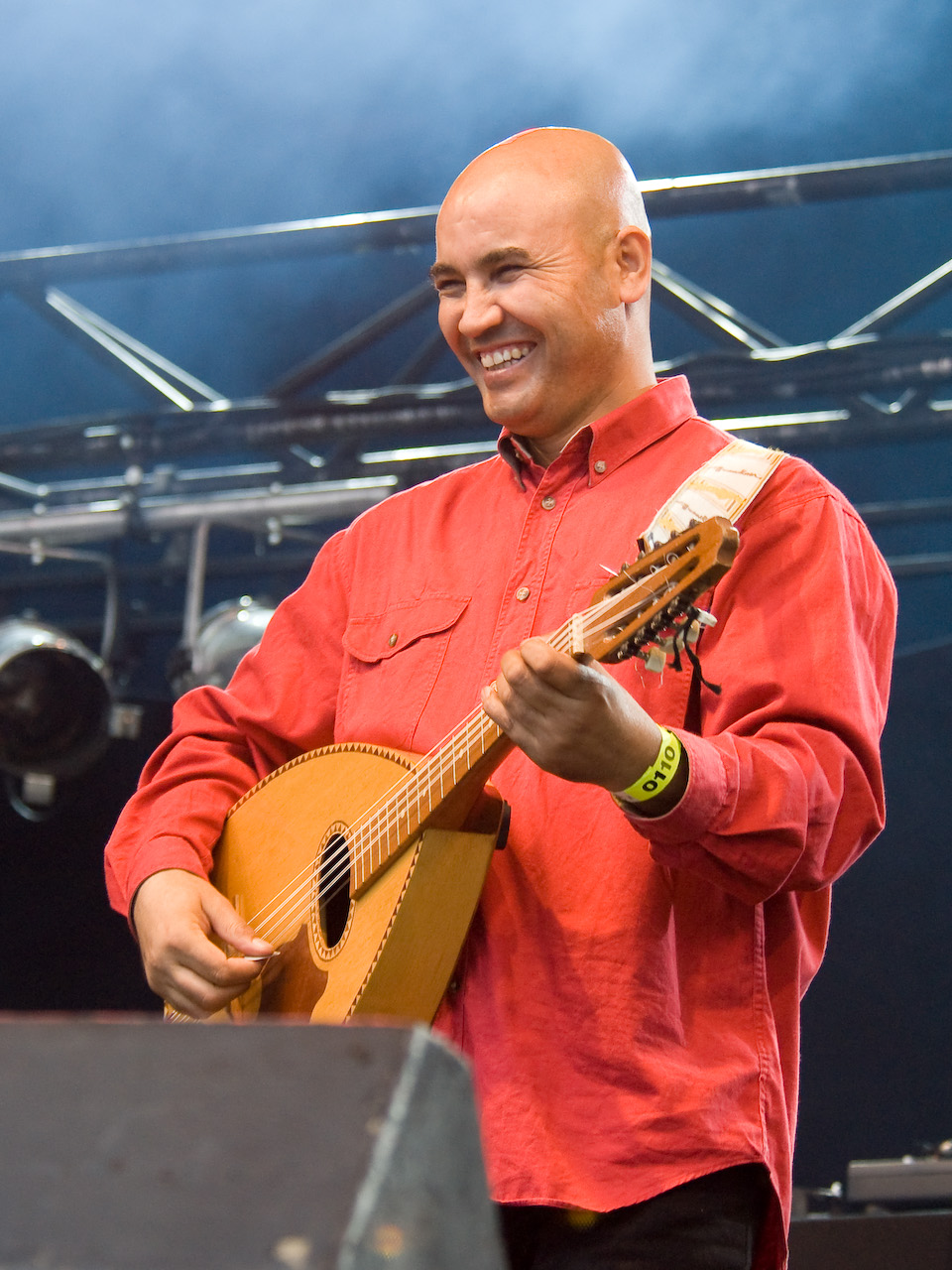
- Abderrahmane Abdelli playing the mandol (Algerian mandole) in concert in Ghent, Belgium on October 1, 2006

Background information
- Born: April 2, 1958 (age 68); Aafir, Algeria
- Genres: World
- Occupations: Singer-songwriter, composer, author
- Instruments: Guitar, Algerian mandole, bendir, darbuka
- Years active: 1974–present
- Label: Real World
- Website: Abdelli.com

Abderrahmane Abdelli (Kabyle: Ɛebderreḥman Abdelli; born April 2, 1958) is a Kabyle author, composer, and singer songwriter known for mixing the traditional North African music of his homeland with modern sounds.

== Biography ==
Abdelli was born in Mechta Behalil, a hamlet in the Great Kabylie, Algeria, during the Algerian War of Independence. His family was displaced by the bombing of their village, Kennour, part of the Tizi Ouzou Province, by the French airforce. After the war, Abdelli's family settled in the coastal town of Dellys. As a boy, Abdelli constructed his first guitar out of an empty oil can, a plank of wood and fishing line. After learning to play the guitar, He was introduced to the mandol by Chaabi master, Chaïd Moh-Esguir.

Abdelli made his musical debut in Dellys, Kabylie, during the 1974 Algerian Independence festival. He won several contests in Algeria for amateur singers. Abdelli produced his first album in 1984, but it saw little success. Two years later, he released an album that sold 12,000 copies, but never received payment from his record company Abdelli produced a couple of albums in Algeria, but moved to Belgium in 1984. It was there "he met producer Thierry Van Roy, who was so fascinated with Abdelli's music that he spent two years exploring the roots of the Berbers' musical tradition at the University of Algiers." Since 1986 he has made his home in Brussels, Belgium.

Abdelli's most popular albums are New Moon and Among Brothers He has performed at major festivals in Europe, including WOMAD and the 0110 concert in Ghent. In addition to Europe he has toured in England, the US and Canada.

== Influences ==
Abdelli's music reflects a heavy Algerian influence. As stated by World Music Central:

Abdelli's lyrics express strong and poetic images of his culture which is threatened from all sides. He expresses himself essentially by symbols which are parts of his traditional culture. He tries to make known the ancient Berber culture which, by its tolerance and openness, is an example to follow in our troubled world.

Abdelli has collaborated with musicians from Europe and South America, often incorporating instruments such as the cajón (Peru), the tormento, the quena (Chilean), and the bandura (Ukrainian).

== Discography ==
- New Moon (1995)
- Au-delà de Gibraltar (2000)
- Among Brothers (2003)
- Destiny (2011)

== Band members ==
- Roberto Lagos (charango, guitar, bombo)
- Said Mohammed (ney)
- Jazouli Azzedine (darbuka, tar, bendir)
- Louis Ivan Leiva Alguinta (Latin percussion)
- Abdelmajid Makrai Lamarti (violin)
- Thierry Van Roy (keyboards)
