= Amar Ezzahi =

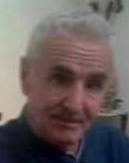
- Amar Ezzahi in 2015.
- Born: Amar Ait-Zaï; 1 January 1941; Ain El Hammam, Tizi Ouzou Province, Algeria
- Died: 30 November 2016 (aged 75); Algiers, Algeria
- Resting place: El Kettar Cemetery
- Occupation: Singer

Amar Ezzahi (1 January 1941 – 30 November 2016) was an Algerian singer and mandole player. He was the figurehead of Chaabi, the traditional music of Algiers.

== Early life ==
Amar Ezzahi was born as Amar Ait-Zaï in Ain El Hammam, a village of Kabylie, Algeria, on 1 January 1941. He grew up in the Casbah of Algiers. He was orphaned as a child.

== Career ==
Ezzahi was a singer and mandole player. He started recording songs in 1963. In 1976, he recorded two albums. He only gave one concert, on 10 February 1987 in Algiers. Instead, he performed in open spaces like cafes and terraces, mostly during family gatherings. Moreover, he shunned the media and turned down copyright checks. He was the figurehead of Chaabi, the traditional music of Algiers.

== Personal life and death ==
Ezzahi lived an ascetic life: he was not married, and had no children.

Ezzahi died on 30 November 2016. Upon his death, Azzedine Mihoubi, the Algerian Minister of Culture, visited his house to pay homage to him. His funeral was held in a mosque the following day, 1 December, and he was buried in the El Kettar Cemetery.

A celebration in honour of Ezzahi, with performances by Abdelkader Chaou and Kamel Aziz, was held at the Arab World Institute on 3 December 2016 in Paris, France.

== Some of his songs ==
- Zinouba
- Esmaa Nousik Ya Inssan
- EL Haraz
- Sali Trach
- El Djafi
- Yel Meknin Ezzine
- Yal Adra
- Aadrouni yahli
