= New Moon (disambiguation) =

New moon is a lunar phase.

New Moon or The New Moon may also refer to:

== Film and stage ==
- The New Moon (1919 film), an American film starring Norma Talmadge
- New Moon (1925 film), an Italian silent film
- The New Moon, a 1928 operetta
- New Moon (1930 film), an adaptation of the operetta starring Lawrence Tibbett and Grace Moore
- New Moon (1940 film), an adaptation of the operetta starring Jeanette MacDonald and Nelson Eddy
- New Moon (1955 film), an Italian film
- The Twilight Saga: New Moon, a 2009 film adaptation of the Stephenie Meyer novel
  - The Twilight Saga: New Moon (soundtrack)

== Music ==
- New Moon (Abderrahmane Abdelli album), 1995
- New Moon (Northern Lights album), 2005
- New Moon (Elliott Smith album), 2007
- New Moon (Swallow the Sun album), 2009
- New Moon (The Men album), 2013
- New Moon (EP), by AOA, 2019
- "New Moon", a song by MØ from her 2022 album Motordrome
- "New Moon", a song by House of Heroes
- "The New Moon", a song by Irving Berlin
- New Moon (nightclub), a lesbian bar and music venue in Paris during the 1980s and 1990s

== Printed media ==
- The New Moon, an 1895 novel by Elizabeth Robins, under the pen name C. E. Raimond
- The New Moon, a 1918 novel by Oliver Onions
- The New Moon, a 1938 novel by Cornelia Meigs
- The New Moon, a 1942 novel by H. Taprell Dorling, under the pen name Taffrail
- New Moon, a 1987 novel by William Relling Jr.
- New Moon, a 1989 novel by Midori Snyder
- New Moon (magazine), a bi-monthly for girls
- The New Moon, a 1995 novel by Claire Lorrimer
- New Moon (novel), a 2006 novel by Stephenie Meyer and the second novel in the Twilight series
- New Moon, a 2007 novel by Rebecca York
- New Moon: The Graphic Novel, a 2013 comic book by Young Kim
- Luna: New Moon, a 2015 novel by Ian McDonald

== Other uses ==
- New Moon (company), a film production company based in Soho, London
- New Moon, a character on the DC Comics team the Moondancers
- Rosh Chodesh, the first day of the month in the Hebrew calendar

== See also ==
- New Moon Rising (disambiguation)
- New Moonta, a rural locality in Queensland, Australia
