= Mohamed Rouane =

Algerian musician and recording artist

Mohamed Rouane محمد روان
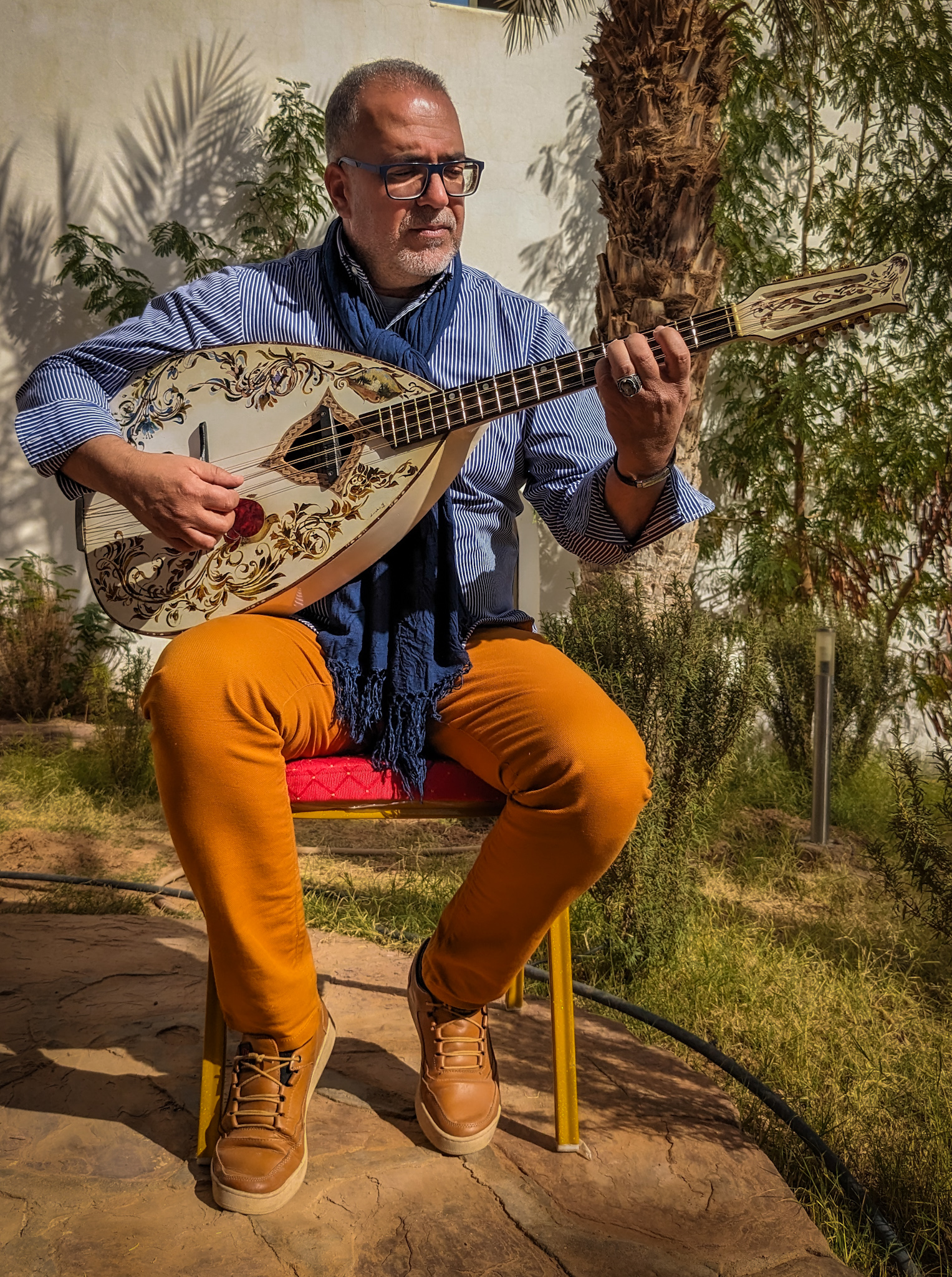

Background information
- Born: Belouizdad, Algiers
- Genres: jazz; chaâbi; flamenco
- Occupation(s): composer, musician
- Instrument(s): Algerian mandole, oud, guitar
- Labels: Mélodie; Dounia

Mohamed Rouane (born 1968 at Belouizdad, Algiers) is an Algerian musician and recording artist, well known in his own country for his performances of flamenco and "Casbah-style jazz" and especially for his use of the mondol.

Beyond the business of being a musician, he is a creative force in Algeria, and his mondol playing credited with raising Algerian music to "higher spheres" in world music. In a feature article, Aljazeera called him an artist with the ability and mastery to be brilliant, able to render the mondol into a respectable instrument. He calls his style of music Casbah Jazz, and fuses jazz with Algerian musical forms to create something new. He has been popular enough to be a repeat instructor and performer at Algerian music festivals. He is also known as a teacher and guest performer at musical festivals in Algeria and Europe, performing not only in nearby Netherlands and France, but as far away as Poland.

His music has been described as a fusion of chaabi with jazz, performed on an Algerian mandole. He has made it his personal mission to change the reputation of the mondol, from an instrument that he couldn't carry in public on the street because of its low reputation to one known on the world stage as an Algerian instrument, one capable of transmitting both Western and Arab feelings. He was inspired by the music of Sheikh M'Hamed El Anka (the "Master of Chaabi", to whom he dedicated his music) and his mondol playing, and Rouan looks to Chaabi to be part of the soul of his own music.

== History ==
Rouane attended the Municipal Conservatory of Ghermoul in 1992, but gravitated away from Andalusian classical music toward flamenco. In 1992 he started the group Triana Algiers, which lasted a few months. He worked at a hotel in Tunisia as an instrumentalist for three years. In 1995 he started another group, Méditerranéo, in Algiers, playing gypsy-style flamenco on guitar. He had good success with the group and recorded two albums with them.

He left Méditerranéo in 2000, starting a solo career. Much of this work is performing instrumentals on his mandole, an effort to increase knowledge of the instrument internationally. His Casbah Jazz records feature his playing lead on a mix of tunes, fusing melodies and rhythms from jazz, chaâbi, tindi (Tuareg music form), andalusian, flamenco, berouali, karkabo and kabyle.

Common to all his later music is his use of the mandole as a lead instrument. Much of the music he does are instrumentals. Rouane has said repeatedly that his use of the mandole for his music is a tribute to the Chaabi musician El Anka, the musician who helped develop the instrument as it is used today in Algeria. Although Rouane blends different musical forms with jazz, he draws the "soul" of his works from Chaabi for inspiration.

When his first album came out, He was disappointed to hear it called a work of tourism. His second album was different. It was a part of his "project in spiritual music," in which the story told by his mondol is reflective, moving toward "spiritual purity."

His last album was published in 2008. In March 2017 he announced in an interview that he was working on a new album. During the music festival at Djemila (13th Arab Festival of Djemila) in the summer of 2017, he was reunited on stage with Selma Kouiret, a singer from his trio Méditerranéo. The two also performed together in Algiers in July 2017, her singing and him accompanying with his instrument.

== Albums ==
=== With Méditerranéo ===
- j'aime (I really like/love), Melodie, c. 1996
- Pour Vous Mediterraneo (For you the Mediterranean)

=== Solo ===
- Rêve (Dream), Dounia, 2005 Alternative date 2002
- Rayon de soleil (Ray of sunshine), Dounia, 2006
- Heureux fans de tristesse (Happy in sadness), Dounia, 2007
- Nulle part (Nowhere), Dounia, 2008
