= Abdelkader Chaou =

Algerian musician

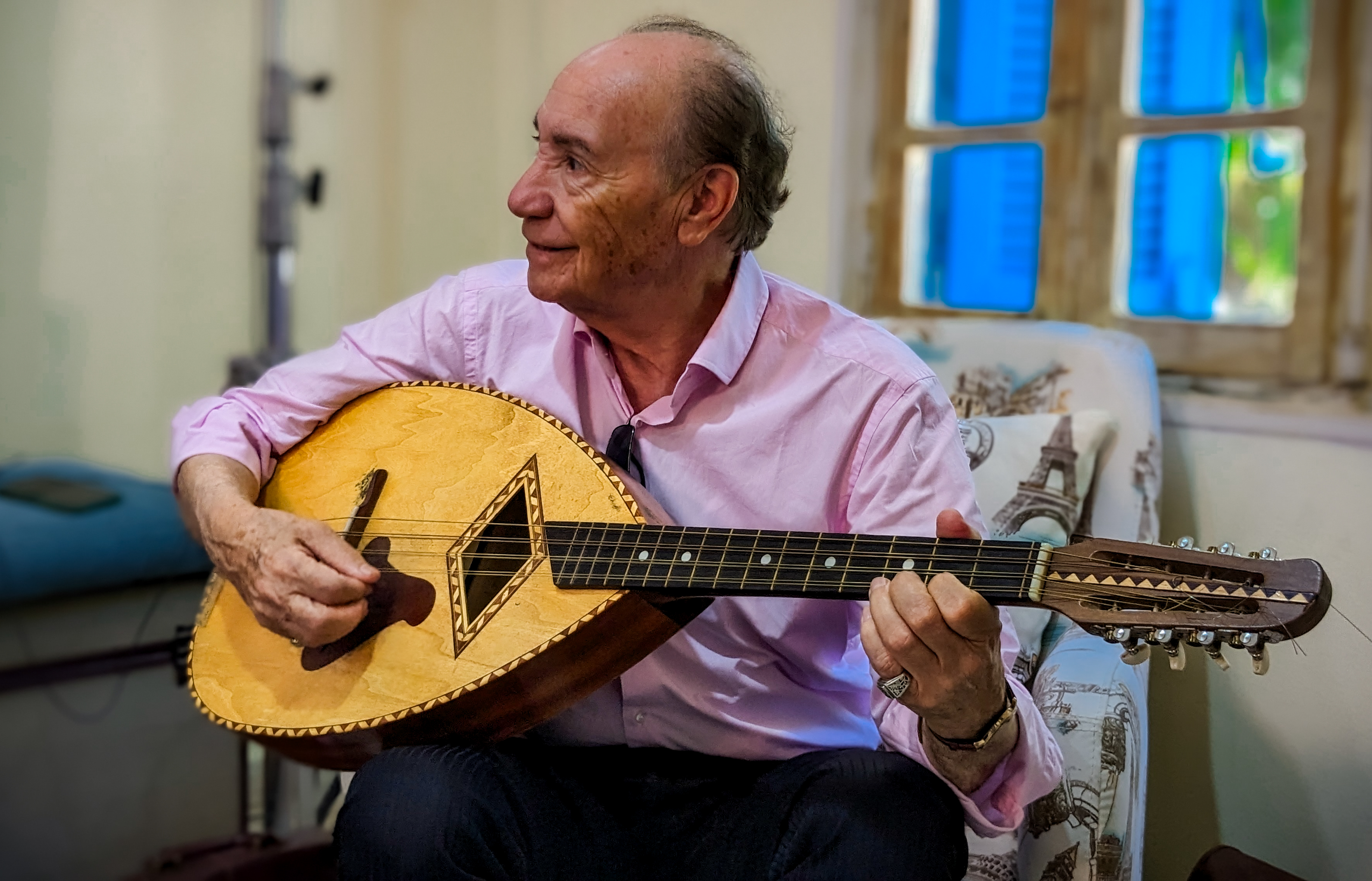
- Abdelkader Chaou in 2023

Background information
- Born: November 10, 1941 (age 83); Algiers, Algeria
- Origin: Algiers
- Genres: Algerian Chaabi
- Occupation: Singer-songwriter
- Instrument: Algerian mandole
- Years active: 1970s–present

Abdelkader Chaou (born November 10, 1941, in the Casbah of Algiers) is an Algerian musician who is well known in Algeria for his own style of chaabi music, both as a singer and a mondol virtuoso. He is considered important enough as a musician that he was recognized nationally at a tribute concert in 2013, an event that was a "tribute from his peers for a rich career."

== Biography ==
Abdelkader Chaou studied at the Conservatory of Algiers (staying in 1967), led at the time by Hadj Mohamed El Anka. His purpose in attending the conservatory was not to imitate El Anka, who he calls "the Master", but to learn technique, how to play the instruments of Chaabi and the rules of the music. While there he learned how to play the violin, mondol, oud, piano, qanoûn, rebab, and derbuka (goblet drum). Besides El Anka, other musicians who he credited with having an impact on his musical education as career included Mehdi Tamache, Cherchem, Ahcen Said, and Mahboub Bati. Mahboub Bati is the educator who took charge of his later education.

He modernized chaâbi to make its style more alive and attractive. Chaou's career began to show signs of success in the 1970s with the songs "Ghazali Goudami" and "Lilah wan cheftou koudami" in 1970, and "Djah rebi ya djirani" in 1973. His influence on modernizing Chaabi has had mixed reception. Some have accused him of distorting the music, while others, such as Mahboub Bati, Mahboub Stambouli, and Skandrani, have embraced it.

His musical repertoire contains both "light" cheerful songs as well as sad, borrowed from the Iberian or Andalusian music tradition. Abdelkader Chaou lives in Algeria where he continues to perform.
