= Algerian mandole =

Algerian stringed instrument

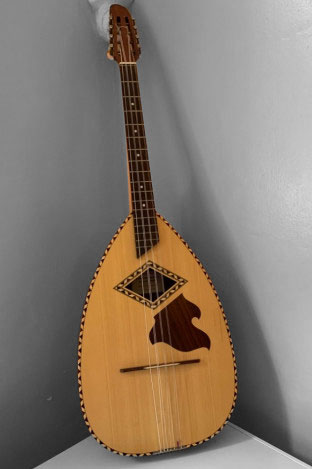

String instrument
- Other names: mandole, mondol
- Classification: string
- Hornbostel–Sachs classification: List of musical instruments by Hornbostel-Sachs number: 321.322 (flat-backed) (Chordophone with permanently attached resonator and neck, sounded by fingers or plectrum)
- Inventor(s): Jean Bélido and El Hadj M'Hamed El Anka
- Developed: 1930s in Algeria in tradition of mandola and mandolin

Related instruments
- List: Family; Mandolin; Mandola; Octave mandolin; Mandocello; Mandobass

More articles or information
- Music of Algeria, Chaabi music, Music of Kabyle people, Andalusian classical music, Andalusi nubah, Nuubaat

The Algerian mandole (mandol, mondol) is a steel-string fretted instrument resembling an elongated mandolin, widely used in Algerian music such as Chaabi, Kabyle music and Nuubaat (Andalusian classical music).

The name can cause confusion, as "mandole" is a French word for mandola, the instrument from which the Algerian mandole developed. The Algerian mandole is not however a mandola, but a mandocello sized instrument.

The instrument has also been called a "mandoluth" when describing the instrument played by the Algerian-French musician, Hakim Hamadouche. However, the luthier for one of Hakim's instruments describes it as a mondole.

== Structure ==
The Algerian mandole is a stringed instrument, with an almond shaped body, built in a box like a guitar, but almond shaped like the mandola with a flat back, raised fingerboard, and wide neck (as a guitar's). It can have eight, ten, or twelve strings in doubled courses, and may have additional frets between frets to provide quarter tones. A variation is to have the thickest strings be single strings instead of double courses. The sound hole is typically diamond shaped, but can be round, and sometimes covered by a rosette.

Instruments have been created with a scale length of 25.5 inches (650mm), but also as long as 27 inches. Overall instrument length is approximately 990mm (about 39 inches). Width 340mm (about 13.4 inches), depth 75mm (about 3 inches).

The scale length puts the mandole in the baritone or bass range of instruments, such as the mando-cello. The instrument can be tuned as a guitar, oud or mandocello, depending on the music it will be used to play and player preference. When tuning it as a guitar the strings will be tuned (E2) (E2) A2 A2 D3 D3 G3 G3 B3 B3 (E4) (E4). Strings in parentheses are dropped for a five or four course instrument. Using a common Arabic oud tuning D2 D2 G2 G2 A2 A2 D3 D3 (G3) (G3) (C4) (C4). For a mandocello tuning using fifths C2 C2 G2 G2 D3 D3 A3 A3 (E4) (E4).

Different styles of sound hole

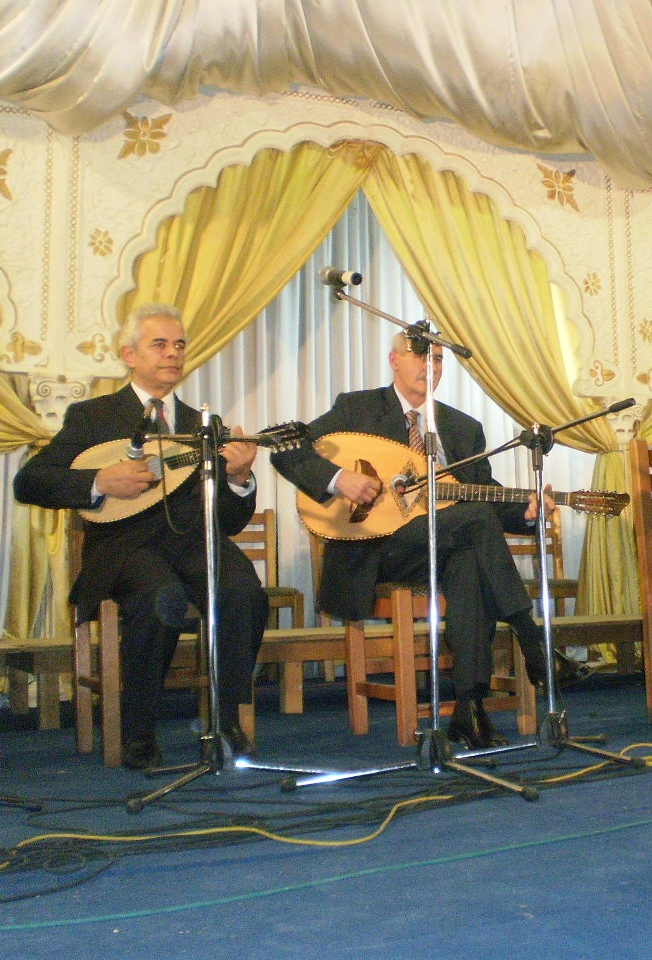
Mandola (left) and an Algerian mandole. The mandole has characteristic diamond sound hole.

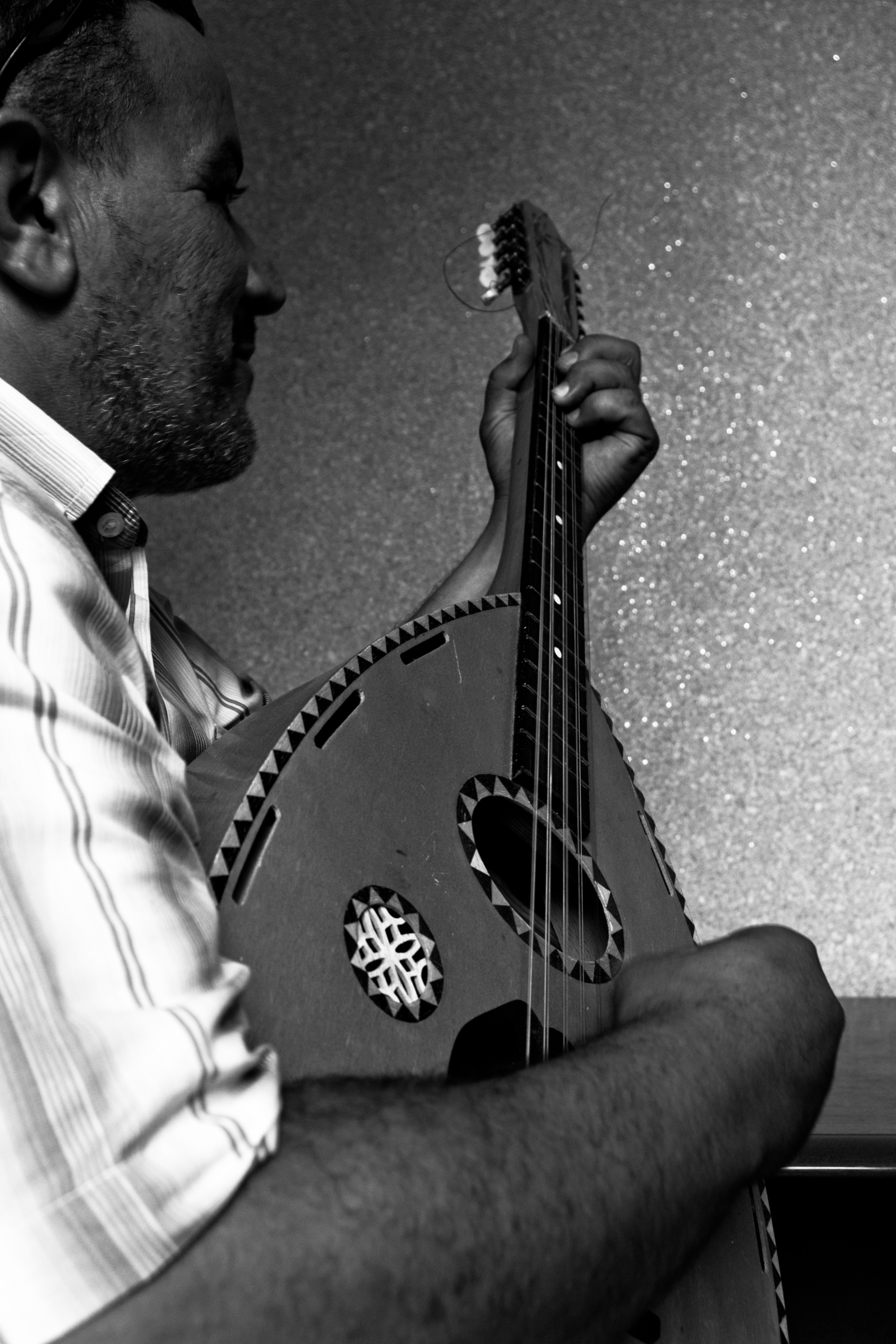
Algerian mandole from the side.

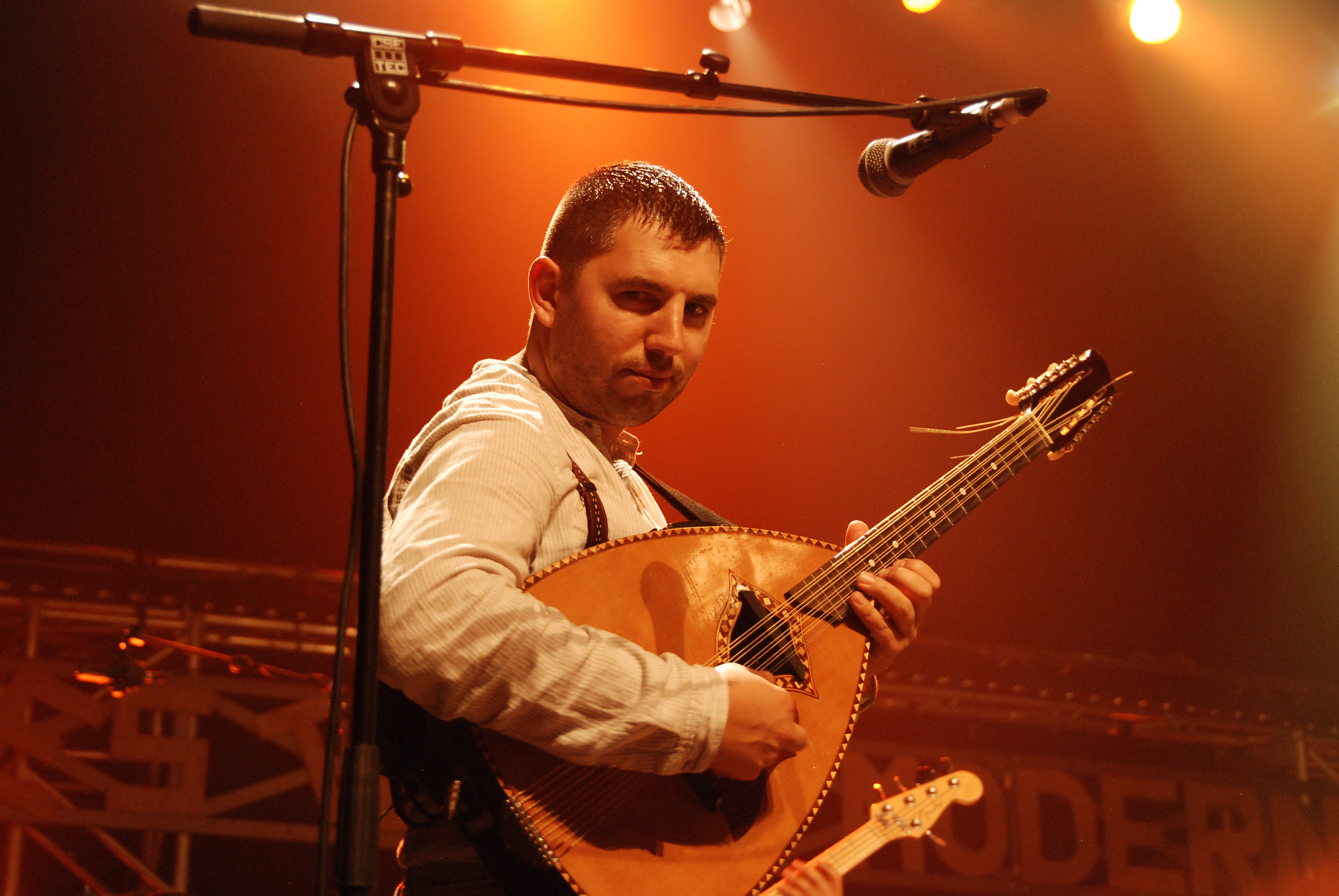
Cheb Medhy performing with his 5 course/10 string mandole at Roubaix on October 19, 2012 as part of the French group HK & Les Saltimbanks.

== History ==
The mandole was the European mandola, reborn in Algeria. The North African variant was made in 1932 by the Italian luthier Jean Bélido, following the design, conception and recommendations made by Algerian musician El Hadj M'Hamed El Anka.

El Anka, who is known for his contributions to Chaabi music, had learned to play the mandola while young. He found the mandolas used in Andalusian orchestras to be "too sharp and little amplified".

Bélido, a music teacher and luthier in Bab El Oued, changed the size of the "demi-mandole" then being played, increasing it, and changing the soundboard structure, case thickness and strings. The instrument he created is closest to the mando-cello in the mandolin family.

== Musicians ==
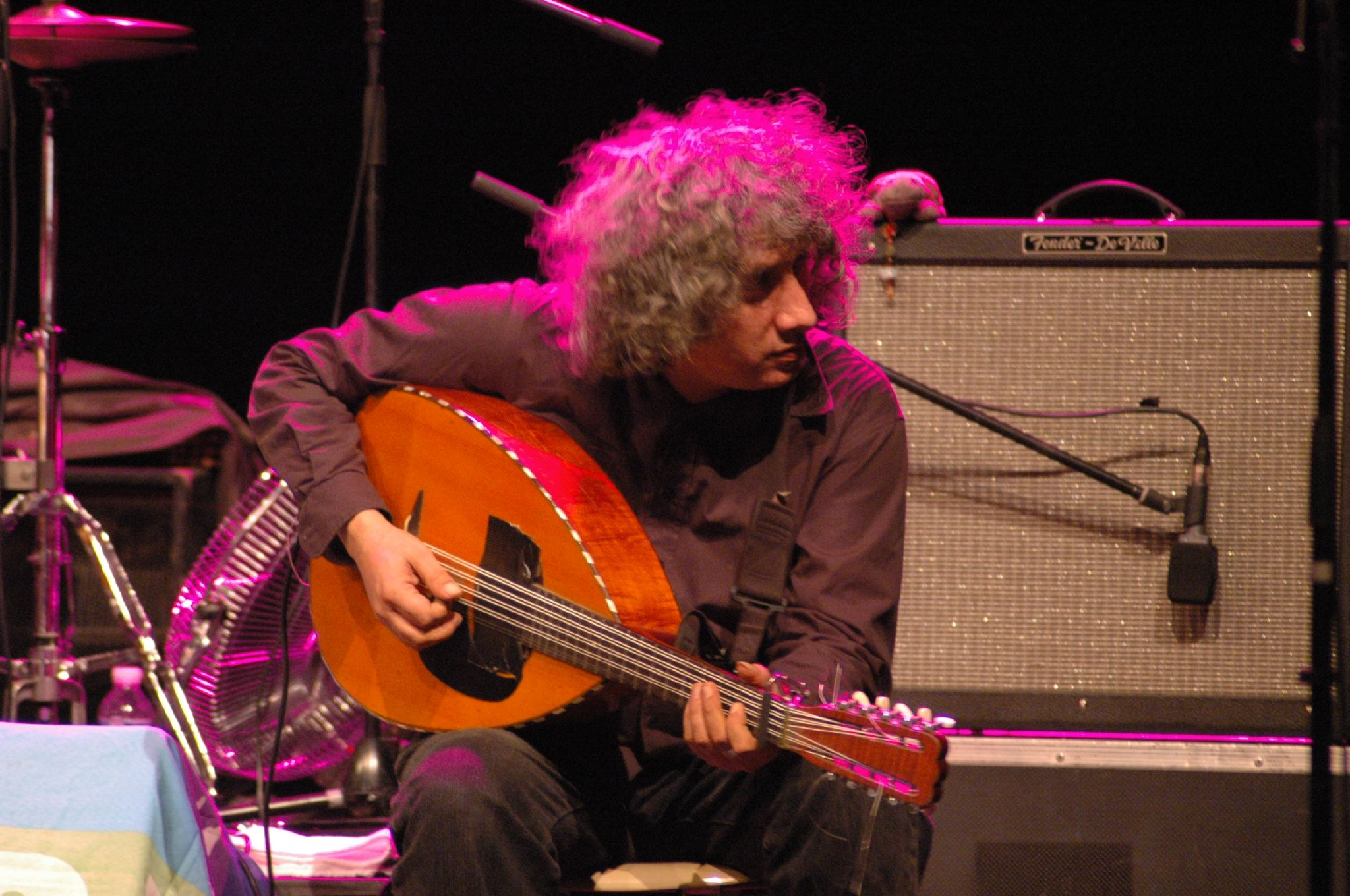
Hakim Hamadouche playing a 10 string electric mondole in Marseilles.

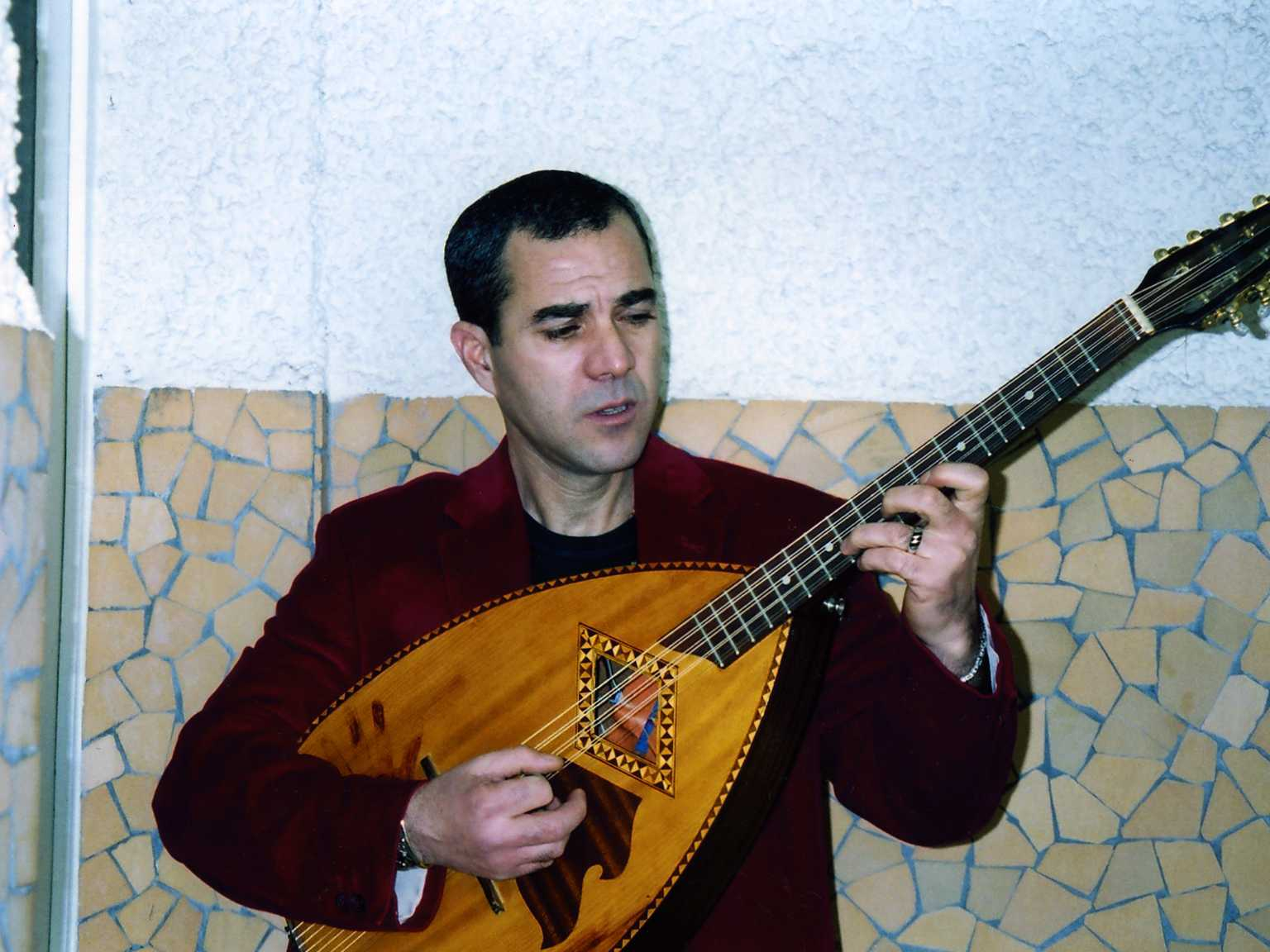
Karim Tizouiar with a mandole. His music helps to preserve and revive the Berber languages and its heritage.

- Abderrahmane Abdelli modern style Algerian mandole player. He often incorporate instruments such as the cajón (Peru), the tormento, the quena (Chilean), and the bandura (Ukrainian).
- Amar Ezzahi skilled mandole player, was the figurehead of the Châabi music in Algiers.
- Boudjemaa El Ankis famous performer of Châabi music, who also played the mandole. He was known in Algeria for his more than 300 songs and for being imprisoned by the French from 1957 to 1960 during the Algerian War.
- Cheikh El Hasnaoui born in Béni-Zmenzer (Tizi Ouzou) famous bilingual Châabi singer.
- Dahmane El Harrachi most translated Châabi artist for his very famous song Ya Rayah.
- El Hachemi Guerouabi, born in Algiers, Master of the Châabi music.
- Lounès Matoub Born in Tizi Ouzou, famous Châabi singer. He used music as a political tool until killed.
- Mohamed Abdennour (also known as P'tit Moh) Virtuoso of the Algerian mandole.
- Mohammed Rouane, (also spelled Rowan and Rawan by translation software) Algerian musician, former guitarist of the flamenco group Mediterraneo and pioneer of Casbah Jazz.
- Moh Alileche, born in Tizi Ouzou, 10-silk-stringed mandole performer (also known as agember in tamazight) in the San Francisco Bay Area, USA
- Takfarinas plays electric mandole that has two necks.
- Project Coast - Algerian mandole player from Wales, UK. Creates music on a mandole made by French luthier, François Baudemont.

=== Luthiers ===
- Rachid Chaffa, mandole maker for artists Guerrouabi, Amar Ezzahi, Boudjemaa El Ankis, Takfarinas and Maatoub Lounas.
