= Azouza =

Azouza عزوزة Iɛazuzen
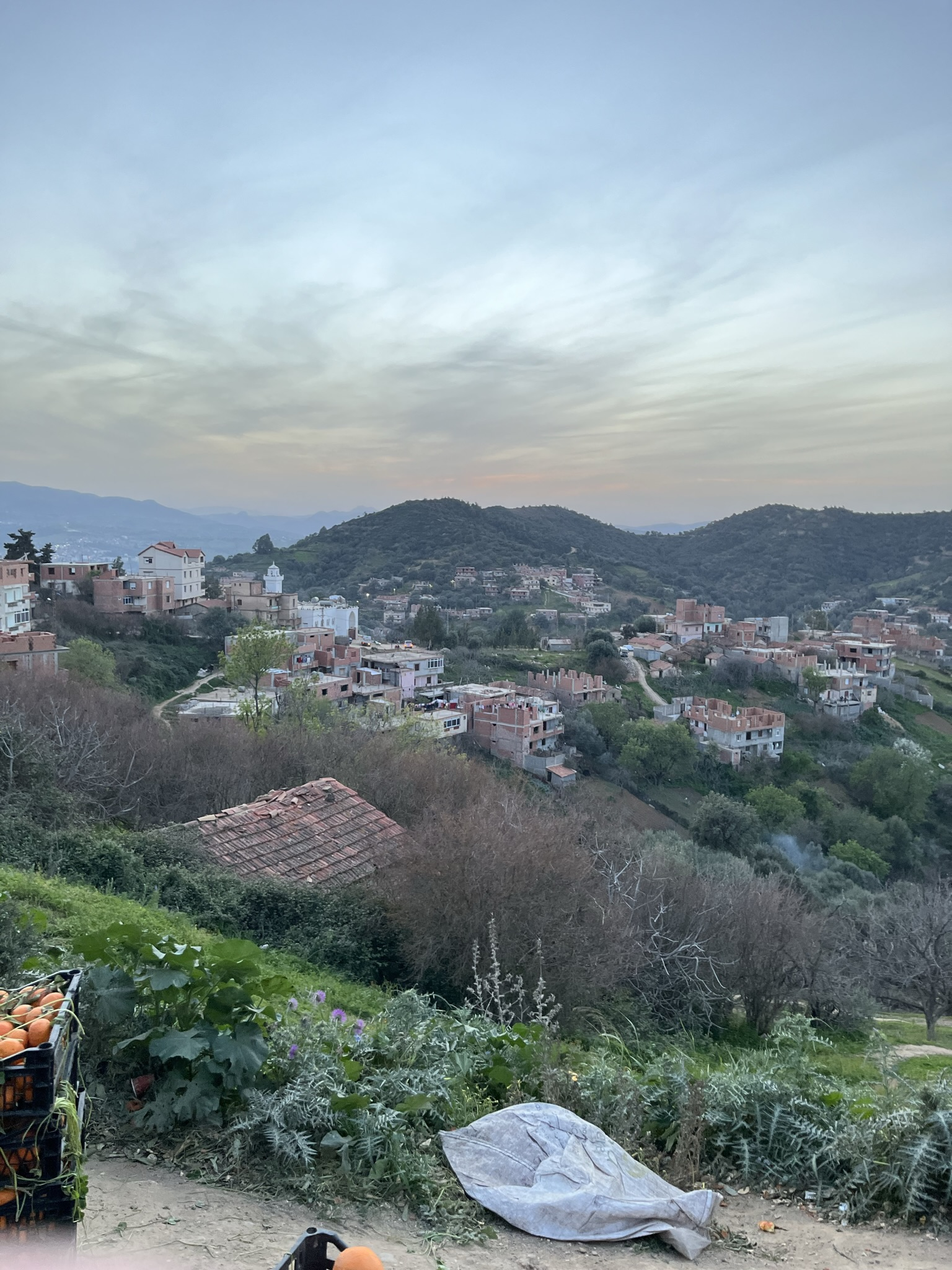
- Azouza village at sunset. Chabet el Ameur is in the background at the left.

- Location within Algeria
- Commune: Chabet el Ameur
- District: Isser District
- Province: Boumerdès Province
- Region: Kabylie
- Country: Algeria
- Elevation: 380 m (1,250 ft)

Population
  - Total: 5,556
- Time zone: UTC+01:00

Azouza ( عزوزة in Arabic, Iɛazuzen in Kabyle) is a village located in the commune of Chabet el Ameur, in the Boumerdès Province in Algeria.

== Geography ==
Azouza is located at the south-east of the Boumerdès Province, at the border with the Tizi Ouzou Province. The village is surrounded by other smaller villages, including Ait Said, Ouled Abdellah and M'Kira, and it is located at about 4.5 kilometers north-east of the communal capital, Chabet el Ameur.

Azouza is bordered by the Oued Bouhaj river and located on the top of a hill at about 380 meters above sea level at the west of the Sid Ali Bounab mountain range, in Kabylia.

== Demographics ==
Kabyles inhabit the village, which is the capital of the At Mekla Kabyle tribe (also known as Beni Mekla), once part of the Iflissen Umellil tribal confederation. The population in 2008 was of 5,556.

== Notable people ==
- Khelif Ou Bouzid, amin (chief) of the At Mekla tribe in 1760-1770.
- Cheikh Ben Bouzid, chief of the Iflissen Umellil tribal confederation in 1760-1770 and father of Khelif Ou Bouzid.
- Abderrezak Bouguetaya (February 1, 1938 - April 8, 1979), interpret and composer of châabi music.
