= Kamel Messaoudi =

Musical artist 1.0

Kamel Messaoudi كمال مسعودي
- Born: 30 January 1961
- Died: 10 December 1998 (aged 37)
- Genres: chaabi music
- Occupation(s): Singer, instrumentalist

Kamel Messaoudi (Arabic: كمال مسعودي), (30 January 1961; Bouzaréah, Algeria – 10 December 1998; Algiers) was an Algerian Chaabi music performer, highly regarded as one of the greatest musicians in Algerian history.

== Biography ==
He was born in a family of Kabyle origins on January, 30th, 1961, in Bouzaréah at the suburbs of Algiers where he grew up. He started performing chaabi music in 1974 in a students group band.

== Discography ==
- Echamaâ
- Ya hassra âalik ya denya
- Ya dzair ra7 tab el qalb
- Njoum ellil
- Kalthoum
- Wahd El ghouziel
- Hanna
- Ech Tsaid
- Asm3i ya lbnia
- Kifech ana n'habek
- Moulat essalef etoui
- Mouhel ana n'nssek
- Win rayha
- Ma n'zid n'khemem
- Ouallah ma d'ritek
- Mchiti ma chfti wrak
- Ma Bqat roudjla
- Men houb hadi laghzala
- Ya lahbiba ma tabkich
- Ya 3rouss -3zziz A3liya- Enta l'habib
- Nuit Elyoum N'tfakrek
- Rahou Mqaderli
- Rouh ya zamen (Samhini)
- Ya Mahla ellil
- Khaliha ta3mel ma bghat
- Al ouadaâ
- Nbghi tkouni Mastoura
- Nahlem bik

== Death ==
He died in a car crash in December 1998, at the age of 37.
