= Zindalii =

Zindalii is an Algerian musical genre. It is a type of folk music from the city of Constantine. As a type of music, recordings of zindalii are very rare .

== See also ==
- Music of Algeria
- Arab music
