= El Gusto =

- Directed by: Safinez Bousbia
- Produced by: Safinez Bousbia, Philippe Maynial, Heidi Egger
- Music by: Orchestre El Gusto
- Distributed by: UGC-PH
- Release dates: September 2011 (Abu Dhabi Film Festival); January 11, 2012
- Running time: 88 minutes
- Countries: Algeria, France, Ireland
- Language: French
- Budget: €2,419,437

El Gusto is a Franco-Irish-Algerian documentary film realised and produced by Safinez Bousbia, released on January 11, 2012 in France, which centers on the reunion of Jewish and Muslim members of an Algerian music group.

== Background ==
El Gusto chronicles the story of an orchestra of Jewish and Muslim Chaabi musicians torn apart by war and exile for 50 years, and reunited for an exceptional concert. The film took seven years to produce.

== Music ==
A studio album, Abdel Hadi Halo & The El Gusto Orchestra of Algiers, was produced by Damon Albarn in Algeria for his own Honest Jon's label. It was distributed by EMI in 2007.

The musical supervision of the film, production of its album and the continuation of the adventure was then provided by Sodi.

== Cast ==
- Mamad Haïder Benchaouchi: in his own role.
- Abdel Hadi Halo: in his own role.
- Reda Djilali: in his own role.
- Rachid Berkani: in his own role.
- Ahmed Bernaoui: in his own role.
- Robert Castel: in his own role.
- Luc Cherki: in his own role.
- Maurice El Médiouni: in his own role.
- Mustapha Tahmi: in his own role.
- Mohamed el-Ferkioui: in his own role.

== Concerts ==
- 2014:
  - 27/11: Opéra de Monte Carlo, Monaco (France)
  - 23/10: Womex, Santiago de Compostela (Spain)
- 2013:
  - 27/11: La Halle aux grains, Toulouse (France)
  - 19/10: La Coursive, La Rochelle (France)
  - 17/10: Festival des Libertés, Bruxelles (Belgium)
  - 11/08: Green Music Center, Sonoma (United States)
  - 10/08: Grand Performance, Los Angeles (United States)
  - 06/08: Kennedy Center, Washington D.C (United States)
  - 03/08: Lincoln Center, New York (United States)
  - 15/06: Festival de Musiques Sacrées, Fes (Morocco)
  - 15/06: UNESCO, Paris (France)
  - 03/06: The Barbican, Londres (UK)
  - 02/06: The Carré Theater, Amsterdam (Netherlands)
  - 31/05: Mawazine, Rabat (Morocco)
- 2012:
  - 30/10: World Music Festival, Oslo (Norway)
  - 27/10: Le Colisée, Roubaix (France)
  - 24&25/10: MC2, Grenoble (France)
  - 21/10: La Paloma, Nîmes (France)
  - 20/10: Les Docks du Sud, Marseille (France)
  - 18/10: Le Mals, Sochaux (France)
  - 30/09: Musée du Judaïsme, Paris (France)
  - 09/08: Les Nuits du Sud, Vence (France)
  - 07/08: Théâtre de la Mer, Sète (France)
  - 05/08: Festival du Bout du Monde, Crozon (France)
  - 04/08: Festival Esperanzah, Namur (Belgium)
  - 13/07: Les Suds à Arles, Arles (France)
  - 11/07: Scènes d'été, Geneva (Switzerland)
  - 06/07: Les Hauts de Garonne, Bordeaux (France)
  - 12/01: Palais des Beaux-Arts, Brussels (Belgium)
  - 9&10/01: Le Grand Rex, Paris (France)
- 2007-2010:
  - Palais des Beaux-Arts, Bruxelles (Belgium)
  - L'Alhambra, Paris (France)
  - Andalousies Atlantiques, Essaouira (Morocco)
  - Les Nuits de Fourvière, Lyon (France)
  - The Opening of the Jazz Fest, Berlin (Germany)
  - The Barbican, London (UK)
  - Théâtre du Gymnase, Marseille (France)
  - Palais Omnisports de Bercy, Paris (France)

== Awards ==
In 2011, El Gusto won two awards at the Abu Dhabi Film Festival, including the "FRIPESCI prize" and Best Director from the Arab World for Safinez Bousbia.
