= Boudjemaâ El Ankis =

Algerian chaabi musician

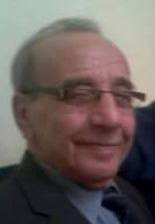
- Boudjemaâ El Ankis in 2015.
- Born: Mohamed Boudjemaâ; 17 June 1927; Algiers, Algeria
- Died: 2 September 2015 (aged 88); Djasr Kasentina, Algeria
- Occupation: Singer

Boudjemaâ El Ankis (born Casbah of Algiers, 17 June 1927 – 2 September 2015), also known as Mohammed Boudjemaâ, was an Algerian performer of chaâbi music, who also played the mondol.

He was known in Algeria for his more than 300 songs and for being imprisoned by the French from 1957-1960, for his protest of their occupation of Algeria.

He became a "pioneer" of Algerian music while working with lyricist Mahbou Bati and inspired a new generation of chaabi musicians.

== Discography ==
- Anya Bejfak
- El Kaoui
- El Meknin Ezin
- Meknasia
- Nousik Ya Hbibi
- Ya El Ghafel
- Ya Woulfi
