= New Moon (Abderrahmane Abdelli album) =

Studio album by Abderrahmane Abdelli
- Released: 1995
- Genre: Algerian music
- Length: 45:00
- Label: Real World
- Producer: Thierry Van Roy

Abderrahmane Abdelli chronology
| New Moon (1995) | Au-delà de Gibraltar (2000) |

New Moon is an album by the Algerian composer and singer-songwriter Abderrahmane Abdelli. It was released in 1995 by Real World Records. The album was produced in Brussels, with Abdelli recording his vocals before he was deported; the album was finished with local street musicians who played Algerian instruments.

== Critical reception ==
Professional ratings
Review scores
| Source | Rating |
|---|---|
| AllMusic | 2/5 stars |

The Toronto Star deemed the album "extraordinarily rich and hypnotizing North African music."

== Track listing ==
1. "Adarghal Introduction" – 1:46
2. "Adarghal (The Blind in Spirit)" – 4:09
3. "Achaah (Resentment)" – 7:07
4. "Lawan (Time)" – 4:01
5. "Walagh (I Observe)" – 5:12
6. "Ayafrouk (The Pigeon)" – 5:22
7. "Imanza (Ancestors)" – 4:29
8. "JSK (The Sporting Youth of Kabyl)" – 4:32
9. "Igganniw (There Are No More Stars in My Sky)" – 4:01
10. "Amegh Asiningh (Bad News)" – 5:08
