= New Moon Rising =

New Moon Rising may refer to:

- New Moon Rising, 1969 novel by Eugenia Price
- "New Moon Rising" (song), song by Wolfmother
- "New Moon Rising", episode of TV series Buffy the Vampire Slayer season 4
- The Howling: New Moon Rising, 1995 horror film

== See also ==
- New Moon (disambiguation)
