= Takfarinas =

Algerian singer (born 1958)

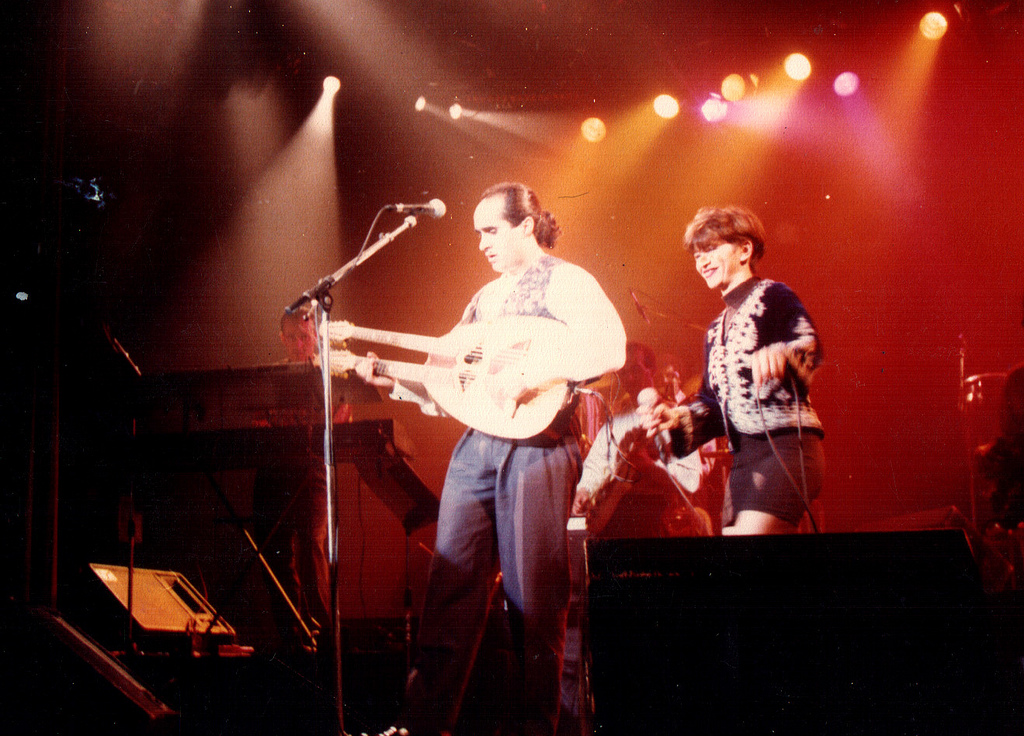
- Takfarinas in concert, 1992
- Born: Hacène Zermani; February 25, 1958 (age 68); Tixeraine, Birkhadem, Algiers, Algeria
- Other name: Tak
- Occupations: Singer; songwriter; musician
- Years active: 1976—present
- Musical career
- Origin: Algiers, Algeria
- Genres: Yal; raï
- Instruments: Vocals; guitar; mandolin
- Labels: Disco Laser; Sonodisc; Night & Day; BMG France; RCA; Vidéo Loisirs; Futuryal Production

Hacène Zermani (Kabyle: ⵃⵙⴻⵏ ⵥⴻⵔⵎⴰⵏⵉ Ḥsen Zermani; born 25 February 1958), known by the stage name Takfarinas, is an Algerian Kabyle Yal musician. Takfarinas took his surname from the ancient warrior of North Africa Tacfarinas who fought against the presence of the Romans in Algeria. Since 1979 Takfarinas has lived in France. However, his songs promote and celebrate the Kabyle culture into which he was born. Takfarinas is perhaps best known for his voice which covers a wide range and the 'takfa' which is based on a traditional lute like instrument which he has modified by adding a second neck. Each neck provides a distinct sound, one neck is feminine and the other masculine. Nowadays the takfa has been replaced by an electric half-drum mandole. Like the takfa this has two fingerboards. The advantage of this new instrument is that it is able to create the large concert sound which he now needs.

== Musical career ==
Takfarinas – or Tak as his fans often call him – comes from a long line of musicians and showed his future innovative skills with musical instruments when aged only six years old he made a guitar using an oil cylinder and brake cable. As a youngster, Takfarinas was interested in the music of artists like Chaâbi, M'Hamed El Anka, Cheikh El Hasnaoui and Slimane Azem.

In 1976, he recorded his first music on cassettes in Algiers, but his position as a singer and musician was strengthened when he recorded his first album in France in 1979. In 1981, he formed the group Agraw with Boujema Semaouni that lasted for many years. He released Wa i telha and Arrach both in 1986, selling a million copies. In 1989, he released Irgazen and Mi d ih, a double CD, and this brought him international recognition. In 1994, he released another album Yebb’a rremman which did well in the European charts.

But it is with his 1999 album Yal and the song Zaâma Zaâma from the album that he achieved his greatest recognition. It remains used in clubs and touristic resorts where the dance tune is popular with accompanying synchronized dance moves.

Takfarinas changed musical direction with his album Paix et salut which was in homage to the Algerian artists who were victims of the repression. Then in 2004, he released his album Honneur aux dames.

== Discography ==
=== Albums ===
- 1979: Yewwa rremman
- 1980: Admenten
- 1983: Serreh i weqcic
- 1986: Way telha / Arrac (double album)
- 1989: Irgazen / Ini-d ih (double album)
- 1993: Romane
- 1996: Tebbeg Riri / Awi Nniya (double album)
- 1999: Yal
- 2000: Quartier Tixeraïne
- 2004: Honneur aux dames / Tajmilt i tlawin (double album)
- 2011: Lwaldin / Inchallah (double album)
- 2021: Ul-iw ttayri / Yemma lezzayer-iw (double album)

== Awards ==
In 1999 Takfarinas won a KORA All African Music Award in the category Best North African Artist.
