= Hawfi =

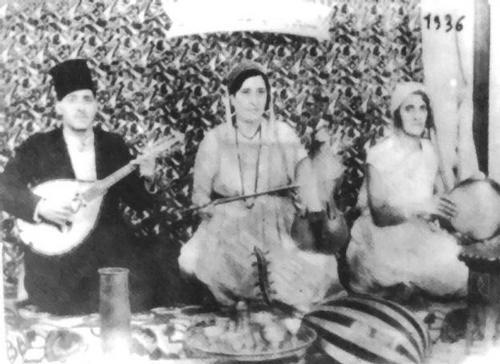
- Native name: الحوفي əl-ḥawfī
- Other names: Tahwīf
- Cultural origins: Tlemcen (Algeria)
- Typical instruments: kwitra (Algerian 'ud); kemandja; qanun

Hawfi is a form of female vocal folk music and poetic genres originated in Tlemcen (Algeria). It is known to have existed from the 14th-century, when it was mentioned by Ibn Khaldun in his work Muqaddimah. It is often sung to the accompaniment of a lute.
