= Bara (drum) =

Spherical hand drum used in West Africa

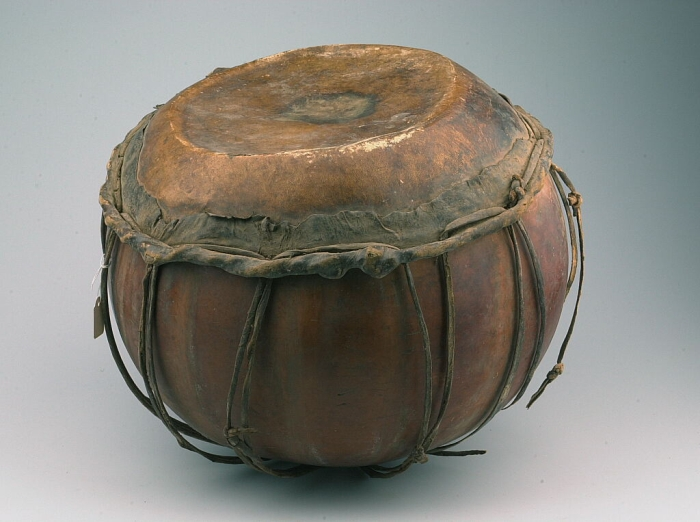
- A bara drum from Burkina Faso (there called bendré)

Percussion instrument
- Classification: Membranophone
- Hornbostel–Sachs classification: 211.11 (Kettle drum)
- Developed: West Africa

The bara (Bambara: ߓߊ߬ߙߊ; also called bendré) is a spherical hand drum with a body made from a dried gourd or calabash, used in West Africa (primarily Burkina Faso, Côte d'Ivoire, and Mali). Its single head is made of goatskin. To make the drum, a dried gourd is cut on one end and a single head made of goatskin is stretched across the opening. Bara drums come in various sizes, some quite large. The instrument is often used to accompany the balafon.

The bara has been used in the music of the Malian musicians Yaya Diallo and Habib Koité.
