= Taarija =

Type of Moroccan membranophone

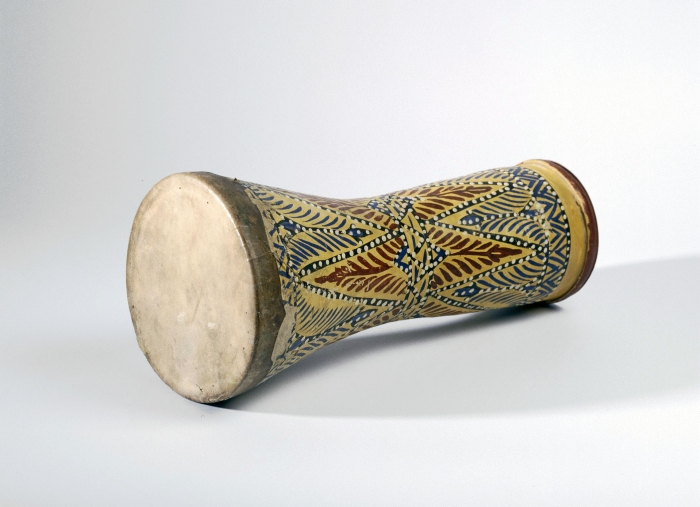

A taarija (plural: ta'arij) is a Moroccan membranophone (drum), single skin and tube, played singly, unlike the tabla, which is a pair of drums, and is related to the darbouka. While the tube may be metal (e.g., silver), it is typically made of baked clay.

In some areas, tara'ij are traditionally given to children at the holiday of Ashura; a boy's drum has a plain baked-clay tube, and a girl's drum is painted in brightly colored patterns. A woman wearing heavy make-up may be said to be painted "like a taarija of Ashura".
