= Nuubaat =

Form of Algerian classical music

Nuubaat (Arabic: نوبات [nuːˈbæːt]) is a form of Algerian classical music. The term itself is the plural form of nūba (نوبة), a suite of old Andalusian musical pieces. It is these multi-movement works that give nuubaat its name. The music originally spread from Islamic Spain to the Maghreb following the Christian Reconquest of Spain and subsequent expulsion of Sephardic Jews and Muslims. In Algeria, the form originally found a home in the cities of Constantine and Tlemcen, with Algiers later becoming an influential center as well.

== See also ==
- Andalusi nubah
