= Cheikh El Hasnaoui =

Algerian singer

- Born: Mohamed Khelouat; July 23, 1910; Taâzibt, Algeria
- Died: July 6, 2002 (aged 91) Saint-Pierre, France
- Occupations: Composer, musician, singer
- Years active: 1930s–1968

Cheikh El Hasnaoui his real name is Mohamed Khelouat (July 23, 1910 – July 6, 2002) was a Berber singer born in Taâzibt, a small town in the wilaya of Tizi Ouzou in Algeria.

== Career ==
Cheikh El Hasnaoui, born July 23, 1910, in Taâzibt, a village in Kabylia in Algeria, is a singer, musician and singer-songwriter.

Orphaned by his mother at two years old, Mohamed Khelouat was raised by his family. The child grew up in the culture of the Zaouias where he attended Timaâmrin, where he learned the Koran and the Arabic language, the script of which he would later use to transcribe his songs. He left his native village around 1930 for the capital Algiers. He then lived on rue Mogador in the Casbah of Algiers and was even part of the Hadj M'hamed El Anka orchestra.

In 1937, on the eve of the Second World War, El Hasnaoui left Algeria for Paris, in the 15th arrondissement. The orphanage, the hunger, the poverty that Cheikh El Hasnaoui experienced during his childhood, marked him for life. Dreaming of impossible, but beautiful things, to escape a most atrocious and unbearable reality... He therefore took off and, like many of his colleagues, began his artistic career in Parisian North African cafes, transformed every Saturday evening and Sunday morning into Chaâbi performance halls. He became friends with certain great figures of the Algerian artistic scene and song based in France (Mohamed Iguerbouchène, Kaddour Cherchalli, Dahmane El Harrachi, etc.). In 1946, El Hasnaoui recorded for Odéon Yemma, Yemma (Mother, Give Me Your Blessing),Ijah Errayis (The Dissolute Life) and Ayatwakal Aberkane (Vibrant Homage to the Native Land).

The second theme of El Hasnaoui's work, unlike that of the legend of the spurned lover, is inspired by his experience of exile. He sang of his own torments as a man exiled and deprived of his native land which nevertheless never left him in his heart and his mind. Everything that El Hasnaoui sang about Tamurt (the native land), this affliction and these setbacks of exile, we find them in legendary songs like La Maison Blanche, Ad Ruhegh, Aqlagh Nesbek, Ya Noudjoum Elil,... The El Hasnaoui's specificity also lies in the fact that he sang in both languages, Amazigh and Arabic. His songs are very short in duration, an unprecedented detail in Algerian and Kabyle song in particular. El Hasnaoui was also the first to address themes considered taboo in his songs in the sentimental register.

From 1939 until the beginning of the 1950s, before the outbreak of the Algerian War, he produced most of his repertoire composed of 29 Kabyle songs and 17 in Algerian Arabic. In 1968, he recorded his last songs: Cheïkh Amokrane, Haïla hop, Mrebḥa, Ya Noudjoum Ellil and Rod Balek.

In 1968, he left the music scene for good. He first lived in Nice, in a small retirement, before settling for the last twelve years of his life in Saint-Pierre (Reunion), where he died on July 6, 2002. He is buried in the cemetery landscaper alongside his wife (Denise Khelouat, née Denis).

Rediscovered in the 1970s by Kabyle intellectuals, it has since been broadcast regularly on Algiers Channel 2; From Lounès Matoub to Lounis Ait Menguellet or later Kamel Messaoudi, El Meskoud, Hamidou, DuOudet and many others are inspired by or evoke the musical work of Cheikh El Hasnaoui, by honoring some of his successes .

== Death ==
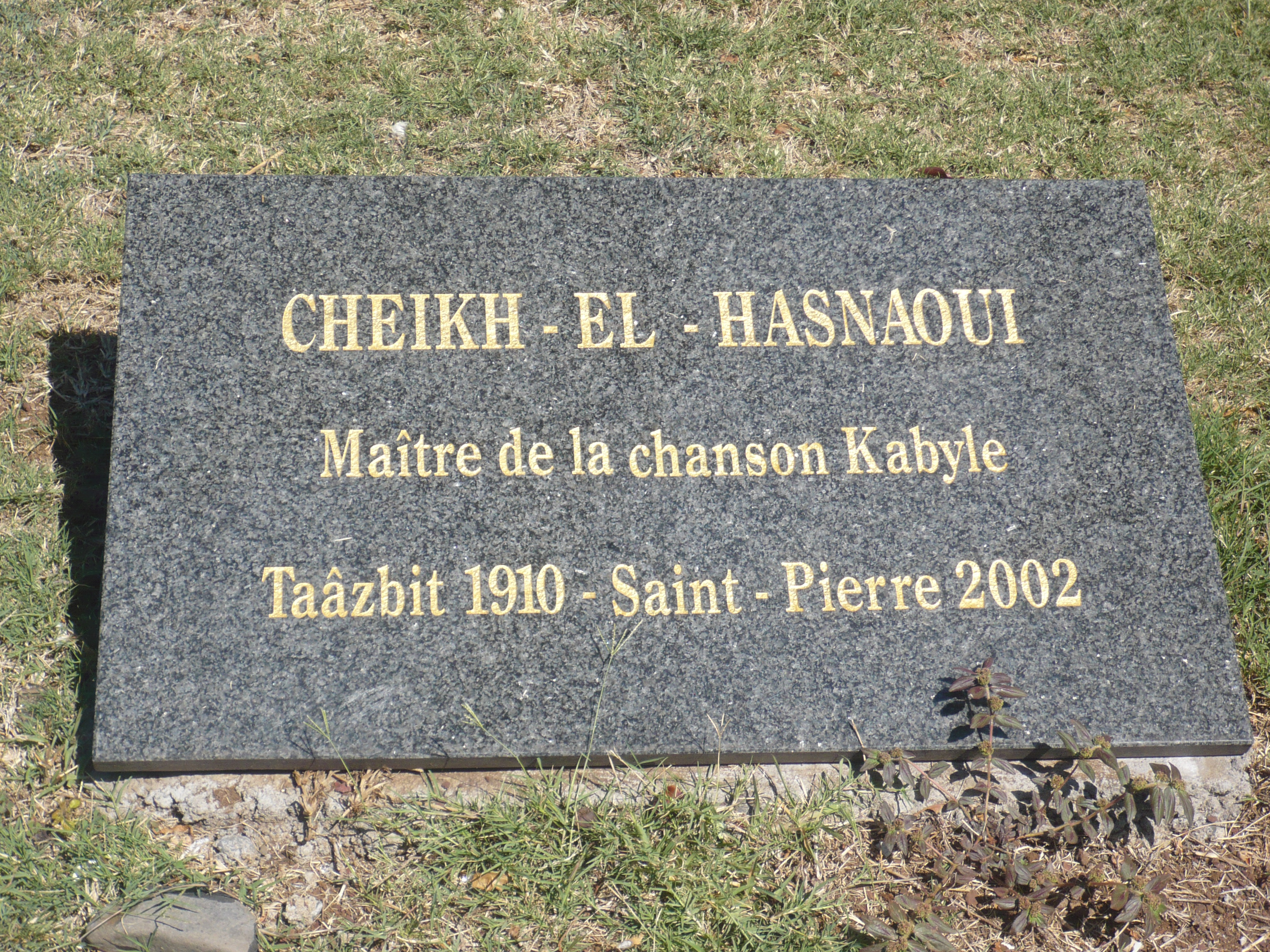
A commemorative plaque of Cheikh El Hasnaoui in Saint Pierre de la Reunion

He died on 6 July 2002 at Saint Pierre de la Reunion, France.
