= El Hadj M'Hamed El Anka =

Algerian musical artist (1907–1978)

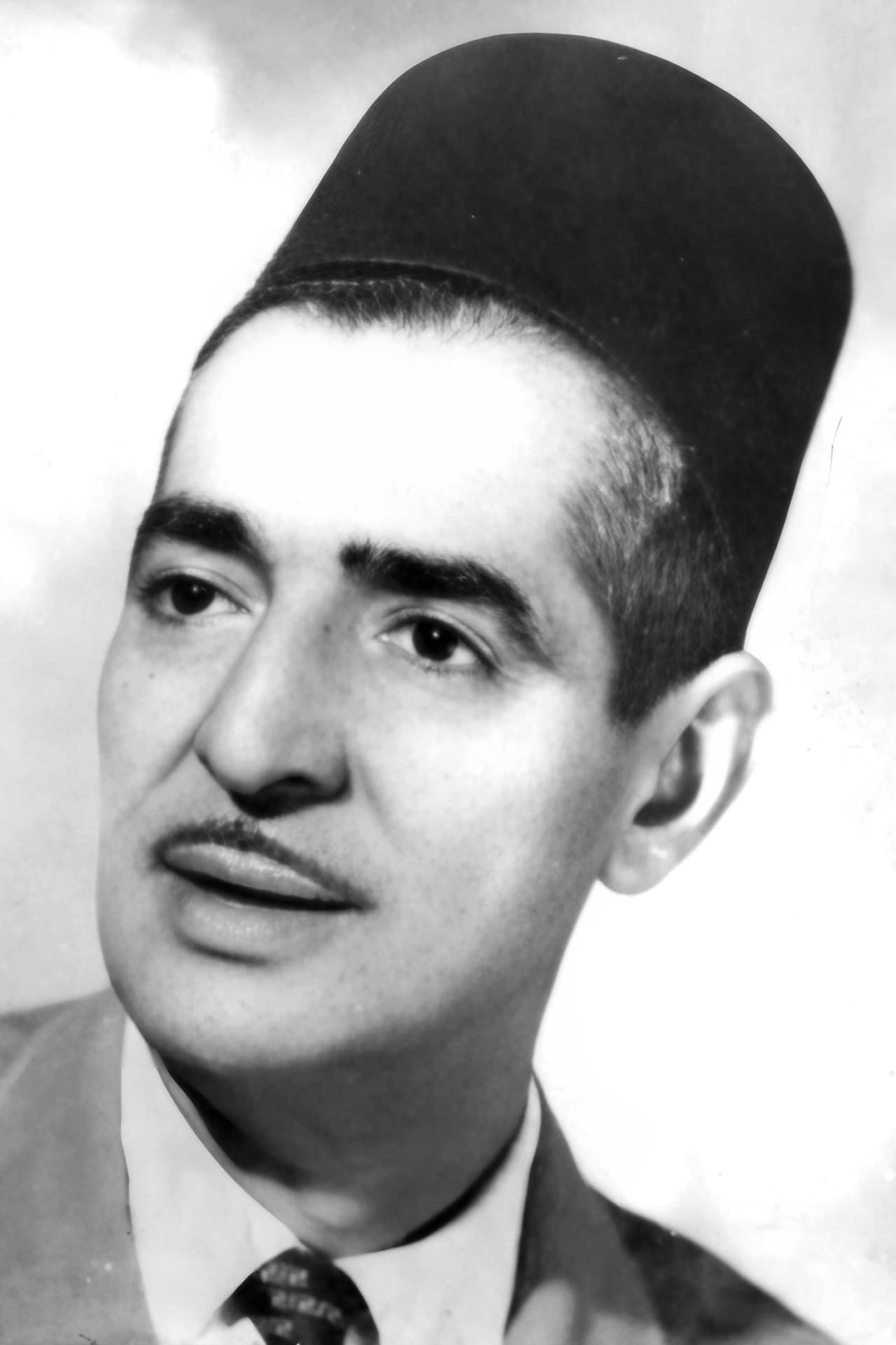

Background information
- Born: Ait Ouarab Mohamed Idir Halo; May 20, 1907; Algiers, French Algeria
- Died: November 23, 1978 (aged 71) Algiers, Algeria
- Genres: Chaabi, Andalusian classical music
- Occupation: musician
- Instruments: mandole, mandola, oud

El Hadj M'Hamed El Anka (Kabyle: Lḥaǧ Muḥend Lɛenqa, Arabic: الحاج محمد العنقة), (May 20, 1907 in Algiers – November 23, 1978 in Algiers) also known as Hadj Muhammed Al Anka, El-Hadj M'Hamed El Anka (and various other combinations), was considered a Grand Master of Andalusian classical music and Algerian chaâbi music.

== Early life ==
He was born on May 20, 1907, under the name Ait Ouarab Mohamed Idir Halo, on 4 Rue Tombouctou in the Casbah of Algiers. His family, Ait Ouarab, were originally from Taguersift near to Freha in Greater Kabylia; his father was Mohamed Ben Hadj Saîd, and his mother was Fatma Bent Boudjemaâ.

His father was taken ill on the day of his birth, and had to be replaced by a maternal uncle for registering the birth, which caused an error recording his name. His uncle presented himself as such to the registry employee, by saying "Ana Khalou" ("I am his uncle" in Arabic), and the employee wrote "Halo". So he became Halo Mohamed Idir from then on.

He studied in three schools from 1912 to 1918: Koranic (1912–14), Brahim Fatah (in the Casbah) from 1914 to 1917, and another in Bouzaréah until 1918. He left school to go to work before his 11th birthday.

== Musical career ==
At the age of 13, the orchestra leader sheik Mustapha Nador noticed his passion and innate sense of rhythm at a festival his group was playing at, and took him on as a Tardji (tambourine player) with his orchestra. The sheik and orchestra taught him the mandola, which became El Anka's favorite instrument.

After the death of sheik Nador on May 19, 1926, in Cherchell, El Anka took over the organization of festivals for the group. The orchestra included Si Saîd Larbi (real name Birou), Omar Bébéo (Slimane Allane) and Mustapha Oulid El Meddah among others. In 1927 he began taking part in the courses taught by sheik Sid AH Oulid Lakehal, which he followed assiduously until 1932.

In 1928 he was first exposed to the general public, by recording 27 discs (78 rpm) for Columbia, his first publisher, and taking part in the inauguration of Radio PTT Algiers.

On August 5, 1931, popular sheik Abderrahmane Saîdi died, and El Anka helped to fill the void. His popularity, supported by the new record player and radio, only grew; he was once invited to perform for the King of Morocco. After Columbia, he made another 10 78 rpm disks with Algériaphone in 1932, and another ten 78 rpm records with Polyphone. Upon return from Mecca (in memory of which he composed the song "El Houdja") in 1937, he reformed his orchestra, and toured Algeria and France.

One element of his sound that would have changed in 1932 came from a change of instruments. 1932 was the year he worked with a luthier to craft a bigger mandola. He found that the mandolas used by the orchestra were too high pitched and not loud enough. He asked a luthier to make one much bigger, and that mandole was to become his main instrument.

After the Second World War, El HadJ Muhammad El Anka was invited to direct popular music on ENRS Algiers Radio which succeeded Radio PTT. The popular music he promoted from 1946 became "chaâbi". In 1955 he began teaching chaâbi as a professor at the municipal Academy of Algiers. His first pupils all became sheiks in their turn, including Amar Lâachab, Hassen Said, and Rachid Souki.

In total, El Hadj El Anka wrote nearly 360 songs ( qaca' id ) and produced approximately 130 records. Notable works included "Lahmam lirabitou", "ltif Sebhan ellah ya" and "Win saâdi win". He died on November 23, 1978, in Algiers, and was buried in the El Kettar Cemetery.

== Relationship with USM Alger ==
Since its founding in 1937, USM Alger has enjoyed a deep and enduring connection with Algeria's artistic and musical community. Among the most notable figures in this relationship was El Hadj M’Hamed El Anka, widely recognized as the father of Algerian Chaabi music. A young El Anka was already engaged with the club's community in the 1930s and 1940s, performing at events organized by USMA supporters. In fact, during the celebratory concert marking the club's founding in 1937, El Anka was among the featured artists, showing early support for the team. This event symbolized the close link between culture and sport in colonial Algeria.

During a financial crisis in the early years of USMA, many artists, including Farid Oujdi, stepped up to help. They organized and performed in benefit concerts to raise funds and keep the club alive a powerful act of solidarity during a time when sports clubs were more than just athletic institutions; they were symbols of identity and resistance. El Anka's most remarkable contribution to USMA and Algerian sports culture came in the early 1940s, when he composed “L’Union L’USMA”, a song that praised the club's victories and honored its athletes. It is widely considered the first patriotic sports song in Algerian history.

The first verse of the famous song "L'Union L'USMA"

                                                 لُيُونُيُونَ لُويَاسْمَا
                                          يَارَبِّي سَهَلِّي نَنْشَدْ    .........    يَا نِعْمَ الْقَيُّومُ
                                           نَفْخَرْ بَلْسَانِي وَانْجَدَّدْ    .........    حَرْبُ التَّقَدُّمُ   
                                         شَايَن لسبور بتعناد    .........    خُصُوصُ للْهَمَّة
                                           عَلَىالْفَحْشِ وَالْخَمْرُ تُبَاعَدْ    .........    بُشْرَى للأُمَّة
                                           رَانِي فَارَحْ بُشَبَانُ الْيُومُ    .........    يَفْجِيوُ الْغُمَّة
                                         مُوجُودِينْ يَضْوِيوْ كَنْجُومْ    .........    في ليلت ظلمة 
                                         اتَّقَدِّمُو وَاجَبْي نَشْكُرْهُمْ   .........    لِّيُونُيُونِ لُويَاسْمَا

                                           حَدَّادُ او زايد أَو مَدَّادُ   .........   رَايَسُ الْقُومَانُ
                                           الْهَاشْمِي لَحَرِيزِي مَعَ كَمَّاتُ   .........   العَبْدَ الرَّحْمَانُ
                                            بُودِيرْ أَوْ بَأَسْطَةً مَعَ بَخْتِي   .........   لَعْدُوهُمْ نَقْمَة
                                          الْعَاقَلْ بَاسَمْهُمْ يَرْتِي   .........   فُخُرْ بُلا حَشْمَة
                                              رَانِي فَارَحْ لُيُونُيُونَ لُويَاسْمَا

                                                L’Union L’USMA
                   O Lord, make it easy for me to sing ......... O Perfect and Eternal One
            I take pride in my speech and renew myself ......... it is the war of progress
                     We play sports with determination ......... especially with great spirit
                        Far from vice and from alcohol ......... good news for the nation
                         I am happy with today's youth ......... they dispel the sorrow
                  They are present, shining like stars ......... in the dark night
              They move forward, and I must thank them ......... L’Union, L’USMA

                             Haddad or Zayed or Meddad ......... Rais of the brave
                       El Hachemi Lahreizi with Kammat ......... Abdelrahman
                          Boudir and Basta with Bakhti ......... their foes face vengeance
                       The wise one praises their name ......... pride without shame
                                          I am joyful L’Union, L’USMA

In its early years, USM Alger relied on modest sources of funding, primarily donations and assistance from local merchants, well off individuals, and sympathizers of the club. Some shop owners even allocated parts of their establishments for the club's use when needed such as Ben Kanoun Café, Ouaguenouni Café, and others which served as informal support hubs. Despite these efforts, the club faced significant financial burdens, including a particularly high cost of 5,000 francs to rent the stadium a considerable amount at the time. Given the club's financial difficulties, several supporters stepped in to help, most notably the renowned artist El Hadj M'Hamed El Anka, who donated the proceeds from several concerts he performed, either to celebrate the founding of the team or to provide financial support.

== Songs ==
- Lahmam lirabitou
- Sebhan ellah ya ltif
- Win saâdi win
- Achki fi khnata
- El Hamdoulilah li ma b9a isti3mar fi bladna
- Sebhan ellah ya ltif
- Hadjou Lefkar
- :maychali fi youm el harb

== Bibliography ==
- Hammouche, Chabane (2014). الجزء الأول مسيرة الفريق خلال فترة الاحتلال 1937 - 1956 (in Arabic). دار كرم الله للنشر والتوزيع.
- Saadallah, Rabah (1981). El-Hadj M'hamed El-Anka maître et renovateur de la musique " Chaâbi " (in French). Algiers: La Maison des Livres. p. 149.
