= Chaabi (Algeria) =

Algerian music genre

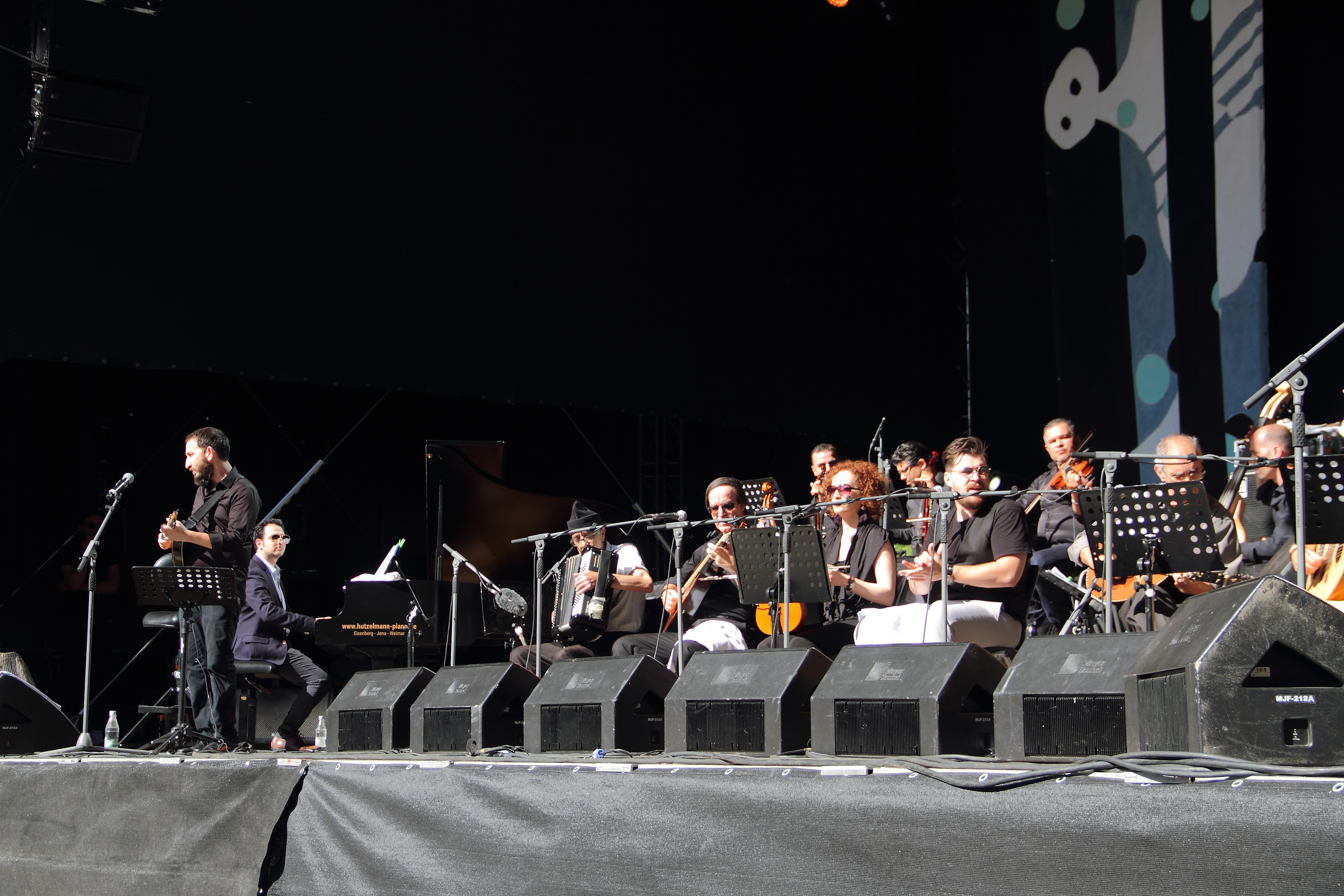
- The chaabi orchestra El Gusto in 2018
- Native name: الشعبي əš-šaʿabī
- Stylistic origins: Arab-Andalusian music
- Cultural origins: Algiers (Algeria)
- Typical instruments: Algerian mandole; Banjo; f'hal; kemandja; piano; qanun; snîtra; târ

Chaabi (Arabic: شعبي, lit. 'folk') is a traditional music of Algiers (Algeria), formalized by El Hadj M'Hamed El Anka.

Originally from the Casbah, the music known as chaabi belongs to a recent tradition. It emerged during the 1930s, and has remained popular to this day. Inspired by vocal traditions of Andalusi music, such as muwashshah, using its modes and rhythm. Chaabi means 'of the people', and it is very definitely the people's music, even in a country where raï rules.

A typical song features mournful, Arabic/Berber vocals, set against an orchestral backdrop of a dozen musicians, with violins and mandolins swelling and falling to a piano melody and the clap of percussion beats. Chaabi is part of a deeply conservative tradition and its lyrics often carrying a strong moral message.

At first Chaabi remained a scandalous genre, thriving behind closed doors or in specific locations called "Mahchachat" (cannabis dens), where the admirer of this music would go to drink coffee, tea or smoke. By the late 1950s, however, it had become the people's music, played at weddings and religious festivals. Its main exponents included Oran-based singer Lili Labassi, El Hadj M'Hamed El Anka, the father of Chaabi, and Dahmane El Harrachi, composer of the classic tale of emigration "Ya Rayah".

In 2011, Safinez Bousbia directed a documentary on chaabi music. It took over seven years to make, facilitate and track the reunion of the Jewish and Muslim members of a chaabi group from colonial Algiers known as El Gusto.

== The best known chaabi singers ==
The best known chaabi singers are as follows:

- El Hadj M'Hamed El Anka
- Hadj M'rizek
- Amar Ezzahi
- El Hachemi Guerouabi
- Boudjemaâ El Ankis
- Kamel Messaoudi
- Abdelkader Chaou
- Dahmane El Harrachi
- Lounès Matoub

== Features of Chaabi ==
What distinguishes this Algerian Chaabi are the sounds and poems, which represent sad memories of times gone by, heart-warming and/or romantic emotions, time spent with friends, and other memories, informed by the backdrop of Algeria. It is music that describes the reality of life and even includes tales and stories such as the stories of the prophet Mohamed and the religious. Today, hundreds of singers are inspired by this music which can be heard all over the world.
