= Art Deco =

20th-century architectural and art style

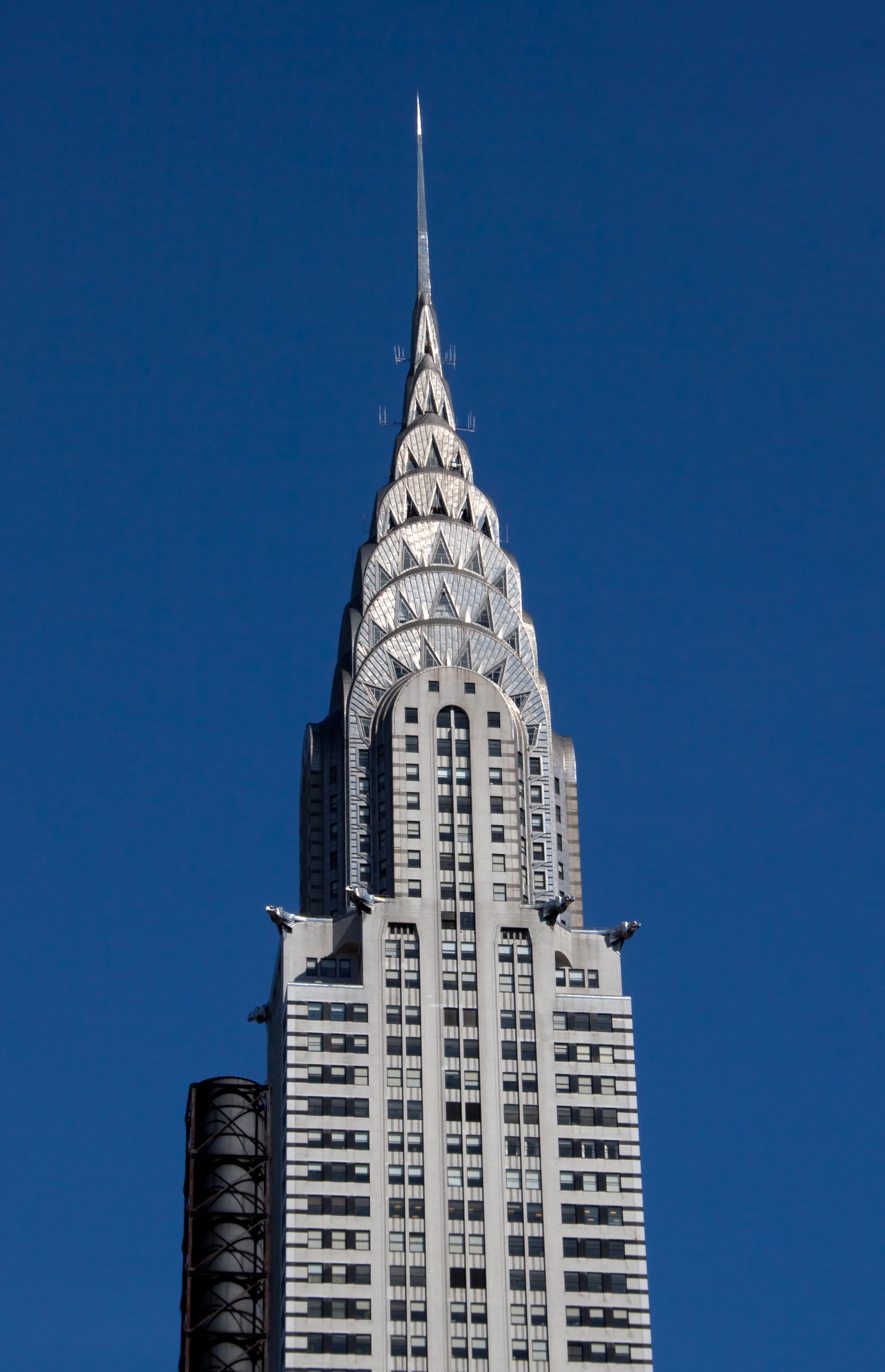
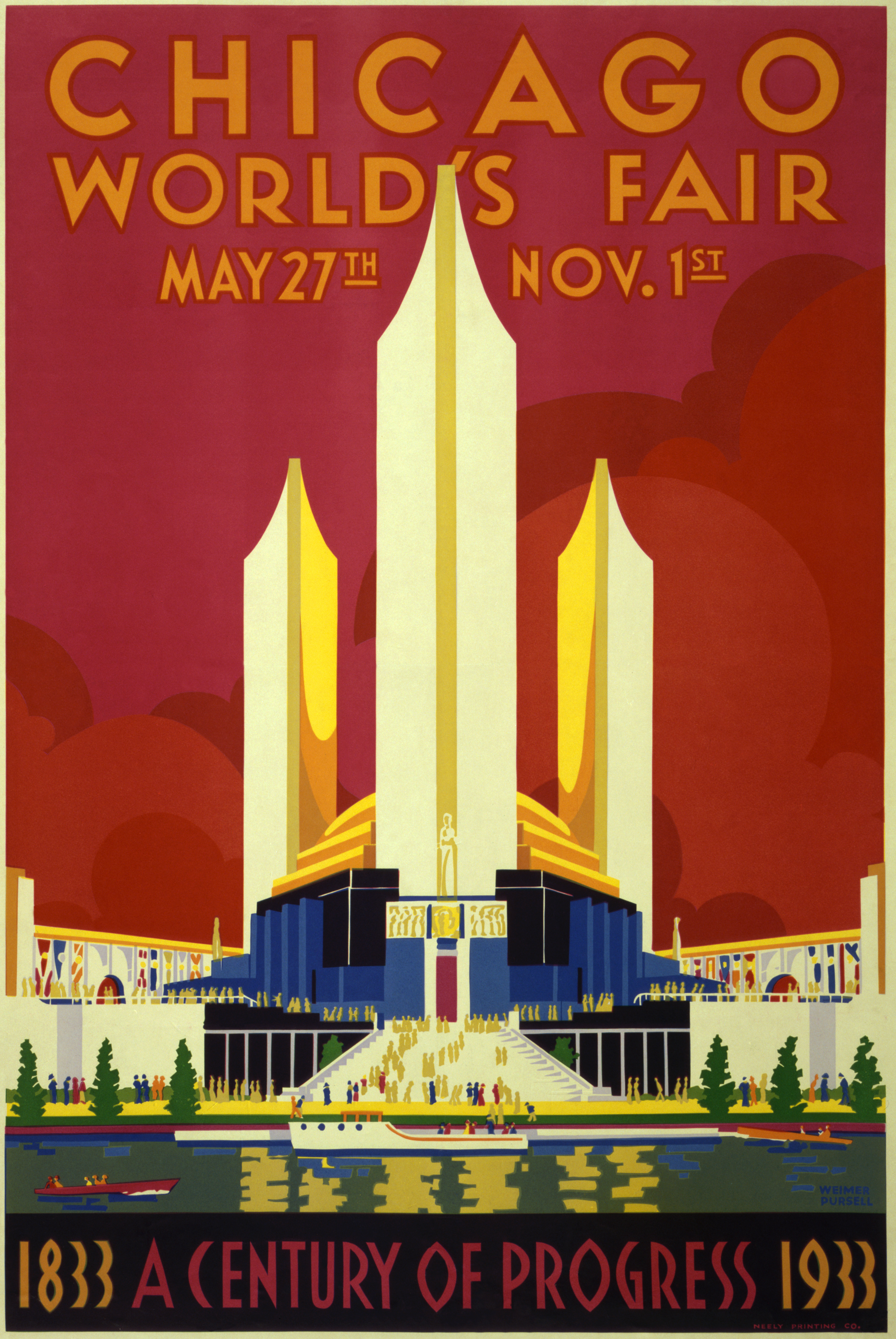
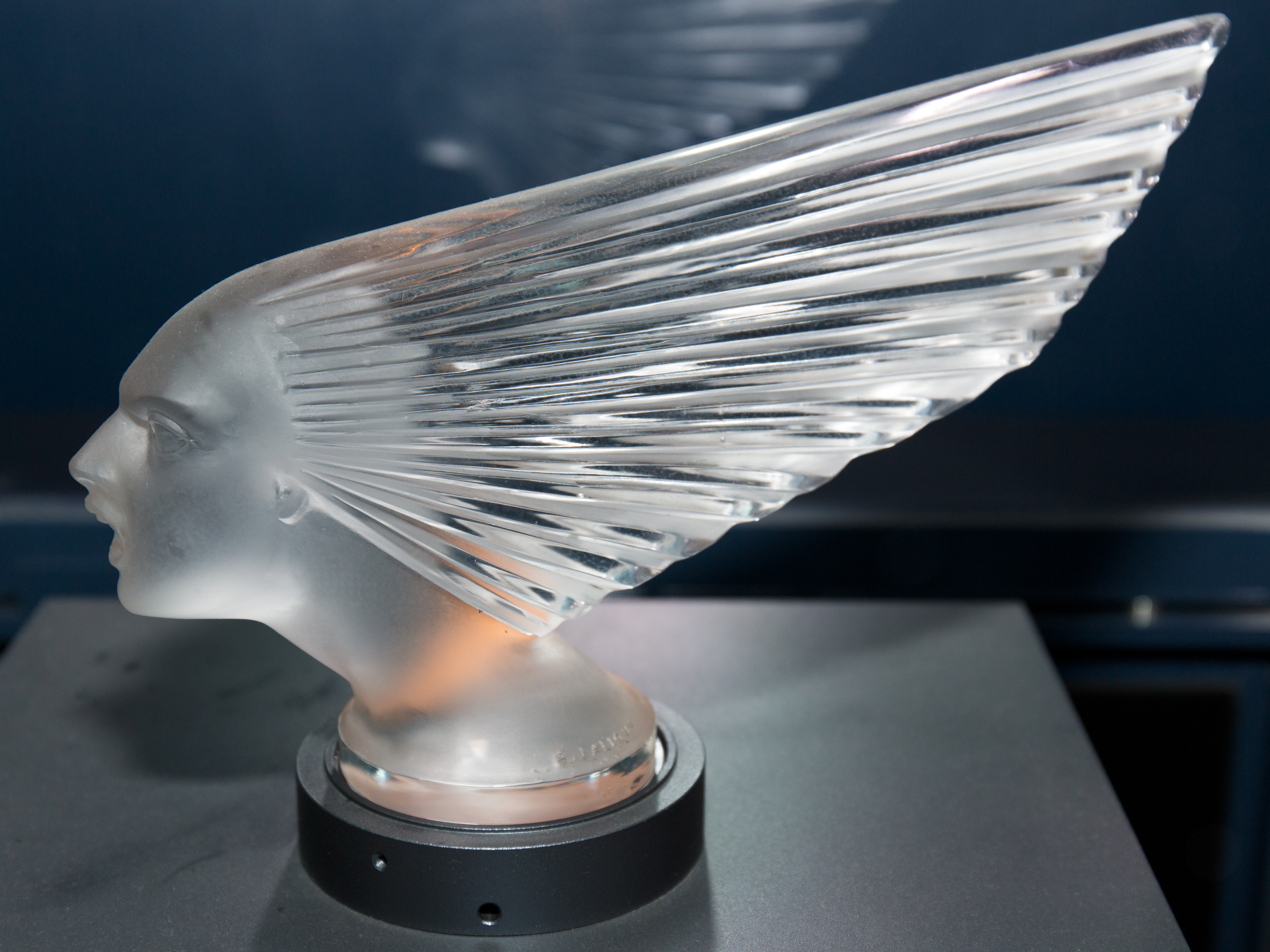
- Top to bottom: Chrysler Building in New York City (1930); poster for the Chicago World's Fair (1933); and Victoire hood ornament by René Lalique at Toyota Automobile Museum in Japan (1928)

Additional media
- Years active: c. 1910s–1950s
- Location: Global

Art Deco, short for the French Arts décoratifs (lit. 'Decorative Arts'), is a style of visual arts, architecture, and product design that first appeared in Paris in the 1910s just before World War I and flourished internationally during the 1920s to early 1930s, through styling and design of the exterior and interior of anything from large structures to small objects, including clothing, fashion, and jewelry. Art Deco has influenced buildings from skyscrapers to cinemas, bridges, ocean liners, trains, cars, trucks, buses, furniture, and everyday objects, including radios and vacuum cleaners.

The name Art Deco came into use after the 1925 Exposition internationale des arts décoratifs et industriels modernes (International Exhibition of Modern Decorative and Industrial Arts) held in Paris. It has its origin in the bold geometric forms of the Vienna Secession and Cubism. From the outset, Art Deco was influenced by the bright colors of Fauvism and the Ballets Russes, and the exoticized styles of art from China, Japan, India, Persia, ancient Egypt, and the Maya. In its time, Art Deco was tagged with other names such as style moderne, Moderne, modernistic, or style contemporain, and it was not recognized as a distinct and homogeneous style.

During its heyday, Art Deco represented luxury, glamour, exuberance, and faith in social and technological progress. The movement featured rare and expensive materials such as ebony and ivory, and exquisite craftsmanship. It also introduced new materials such as chrome plating, stainless steel, and plastic. In New York, the Empire State Building, the Chrysler Building, and other buildings from the 1920s and 1930s are monuments to the style. The largest concentration of Art Deco architecture in the world is in Miami Beach, Florida.

Art Deco became more subdued during the Great Depression. A sleeker form of the style appeared in the 1930s called Streamline Moderne, featuring curving forms and smooth, polished surfaces. Art Deco was an international style but, after the outbreak of World War II, it lost its dominance to the functional and unadorned styles of modern architecture, in particular what is now called the International Style.

== Terminology ==
Art Deco took its name, short for Arts Décoratifs, from the International Exhibition of Modern Decorative and Industrial Arts held in Paris in 1925. In France the distinction of arts décoratifs was first made in the 1858 Bulletin de la Société française de photographie. In 1868, Le Figaro used the term objets d'art décoratifs for objects for stage scenery created for the Théâtre de l'Opéra. In 1875, furniture designers, textile, jewellers, glass-workers, and other craftsmen were officially given the status of artists by the French government. In 1920 the École nationale supérieure des arts décoratifs (ENSAD) was established.

The actual term Art déco did not appear in print until 1966, in the title of the first modern exhibition on the subject, held by the Museum of Decorative Arts in Paris, Les Années 25 : Art déco, Bauhaus, Stijl, Esprit nouveau, which covered a variety of major styles in the 1920s and 1930s. The term was then used in a 1966 newspaper article by Hillary Gelson in The Times, describing the different styles at the exhibit.

Art Deco gained currency as a broadly applied stylistic label in 1968 when historian Bevis Hillier published the first major academic book on it, Art Deco of the 20s and 30s. He noted that the term was already being used by art dealers, and cites The Times (2 November 1966) and an essay named Les Arts Déco in Elle magazine (November 1967) as examples. In 1971, he organized an exhibition at the Minneapolis Institute of Arts, which he details in his book The World of Art Deco.

Mike Hope lists many other labels that were used for Art Deco architecture: Odeon Style, Liberty style, Style Moderne, Jazz Moderne, Zigzag Moderne, British Moderne, Nautical Moderne, Modern Ship Style, Pacqueboat Style, Ocean Liner Style, White Modern, Futurist Art Deco, Streamline Beaux Arts, Streamline Moderne, PWA Moderne, PWA/WPA Moderne, Federal Moderne, Depression Moderne, Classical Moderne, Classical Modernism, Modernist Classical, Chicago School, Czech Architectural Cubism, Italian Futurism, Prairie School, Atmospheric Theatre, Med Deco, Amsterdam School, Nieuwe Zakelijkheid as in New Objectivity, Mayan Revival, Japanese Secession, Spanish Pueblo Style, Pueblo Deco, Finnish National Romanticism, Neo-Gothic, Neo-Byzantine, Neo-Egyptian, Spanish Mission, International School, European International Style, Wiener Werkstätte, Free Classicism, Stripped Neo-Classicism, Deco Free Classicism, Stripped Classicism, Transitional Modern, Vogue Regency.

== Origins ==
=== New materials and technologies ===
New materials and technologies, especially reinforced concrete, were key to the development and appearance of Art Deco. The first concrete house was built in 1853 in the Paris suburbs by François Coignet. In 1877, Joseph Monier introduced the idea of strengthening the concrete with a mesh of iron rods in a grill pattern. In 1893, Auguste Perret built the first concrete garage in Paris, then an apartment building, a house, then, in 1913, the Théâtre des Champs-Élysées.

The theatre was denounced by one critic as the "Zeppelin of Avenue Montaigne", an alleged Germanic influence, copied from the Vienna Secession. Thereafter, the majority of Art Deco buildings were made of reinforced concrete, which gave greater freedom of form and less need for reinforcing pillars and columns. Perret was also a pioneer in covering the concrete with ceramic tiles, both for protection and decoration. The architect Le Corbusier first learned the uses of reinforced concrete while working as a draftsman in Perret's studio.

Other new technologies that were important to Art Deco were new methods in producing plate glass, which was less expensive and allowed much larger and stronger windows, and for mass-producing aluminium, which was used for building and window frames and later, by Corbusier, Warren McArthur, and others, for lightweight furniture.

=== Vienna Secession and Wiener Werkstätte (1897–1912) ===
The architects of the Vienna Secession (formed 1897), especially Josef Hoffmann, had a notable influence on Art Deco. His Stoclet Palace, in Brussels (1905–1911), was a prototype of the Art Deco style, featuring geometric volumes, symmetry, straight lines, concrete covered with marble plaques, finely-sculpted ornament, and lavish interiors, including mosaic friezes by Gustav Klimt. Hoffmann was also a founder of the Wiener Werkstätte (1903–1932), an association of craftsmen and interior designers working in the new style. This became the model for the Compagnie des arts français, created in 1919, which brought together André Mare and Louis Süe, the first leading French Art Deco designers and decorators.

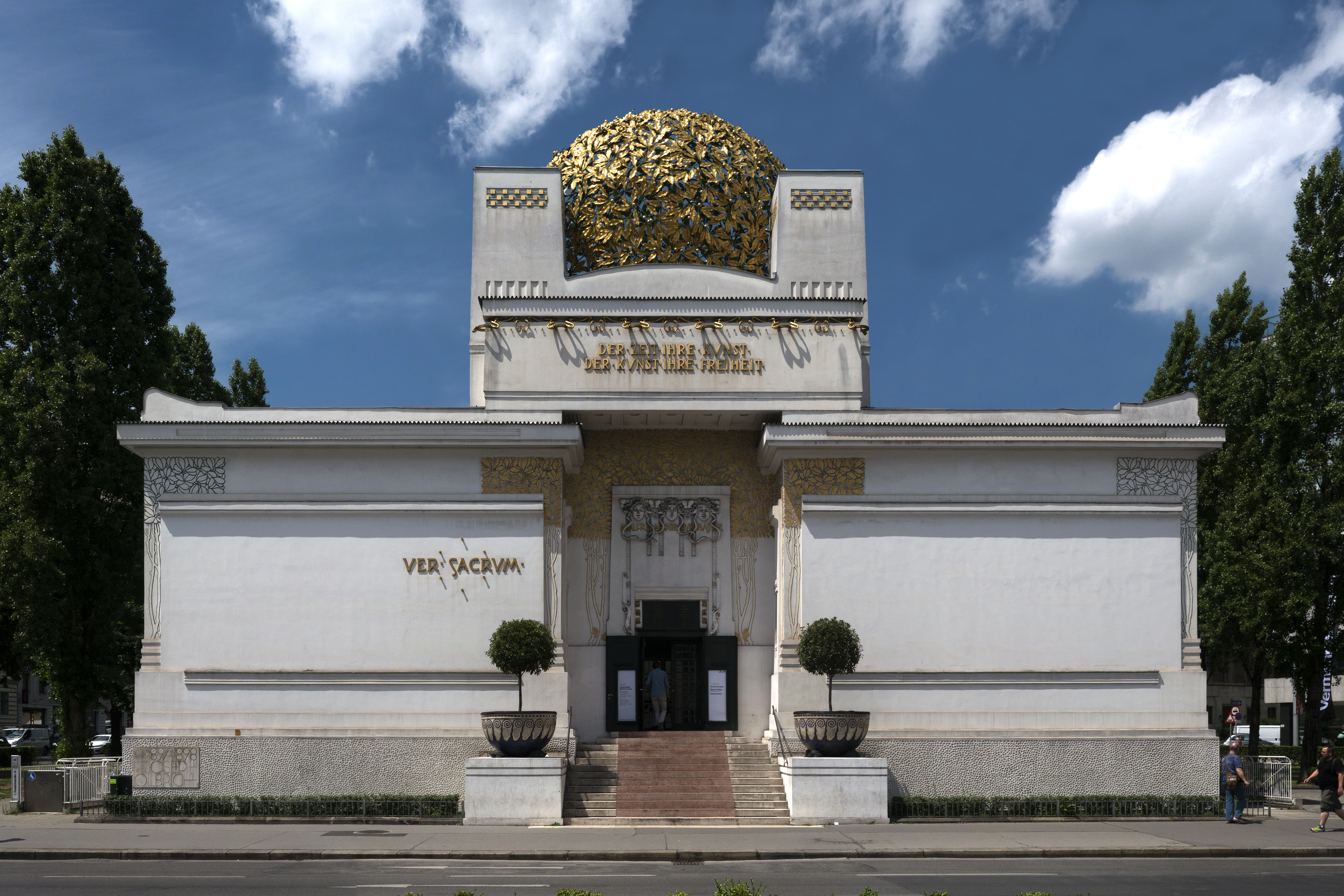
Secession Building in Vienna by Joseph Maria Olbrich (1897–98)

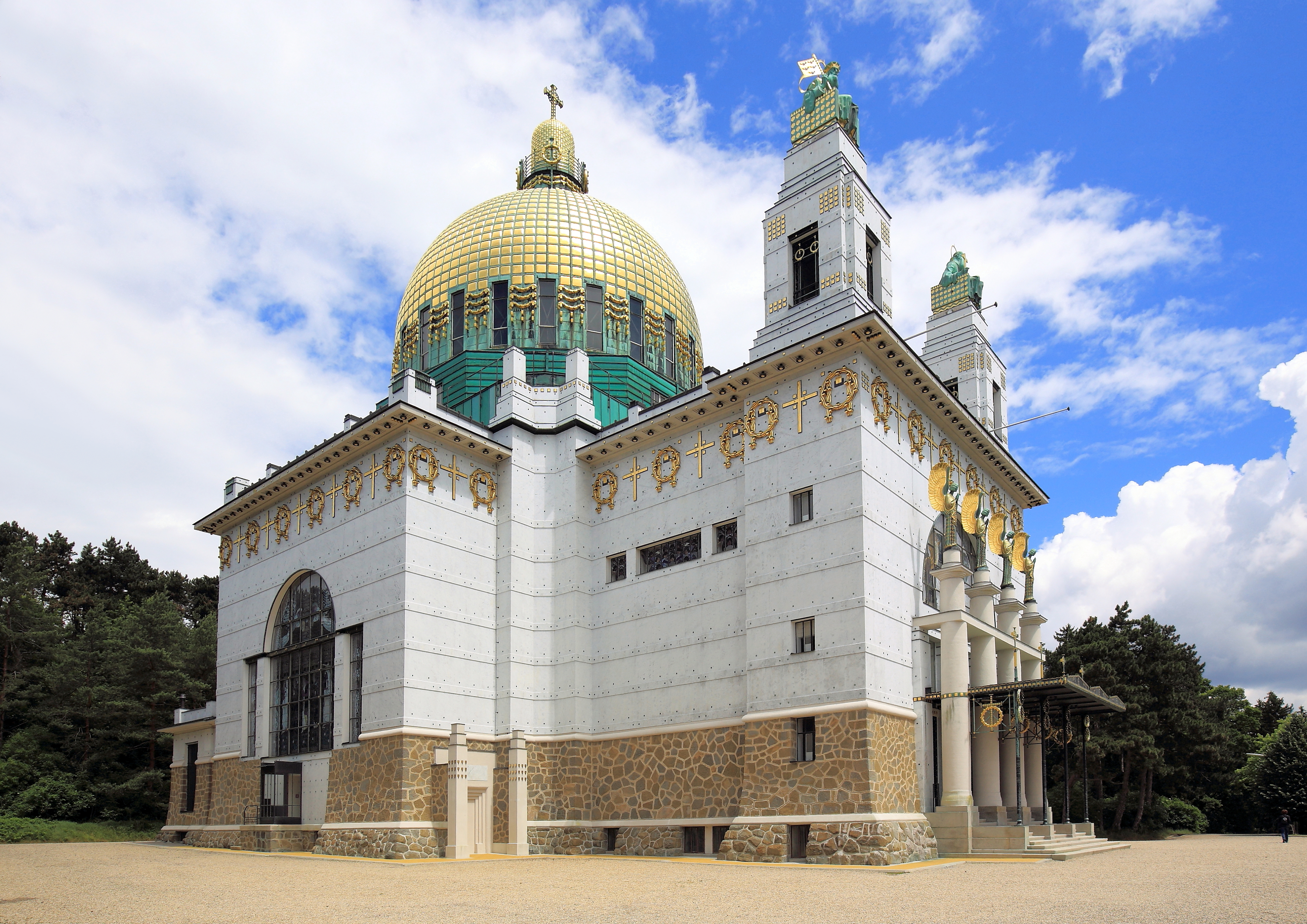
Church of St. Leopold in Vienna by Otto Wagner (1903–1907)

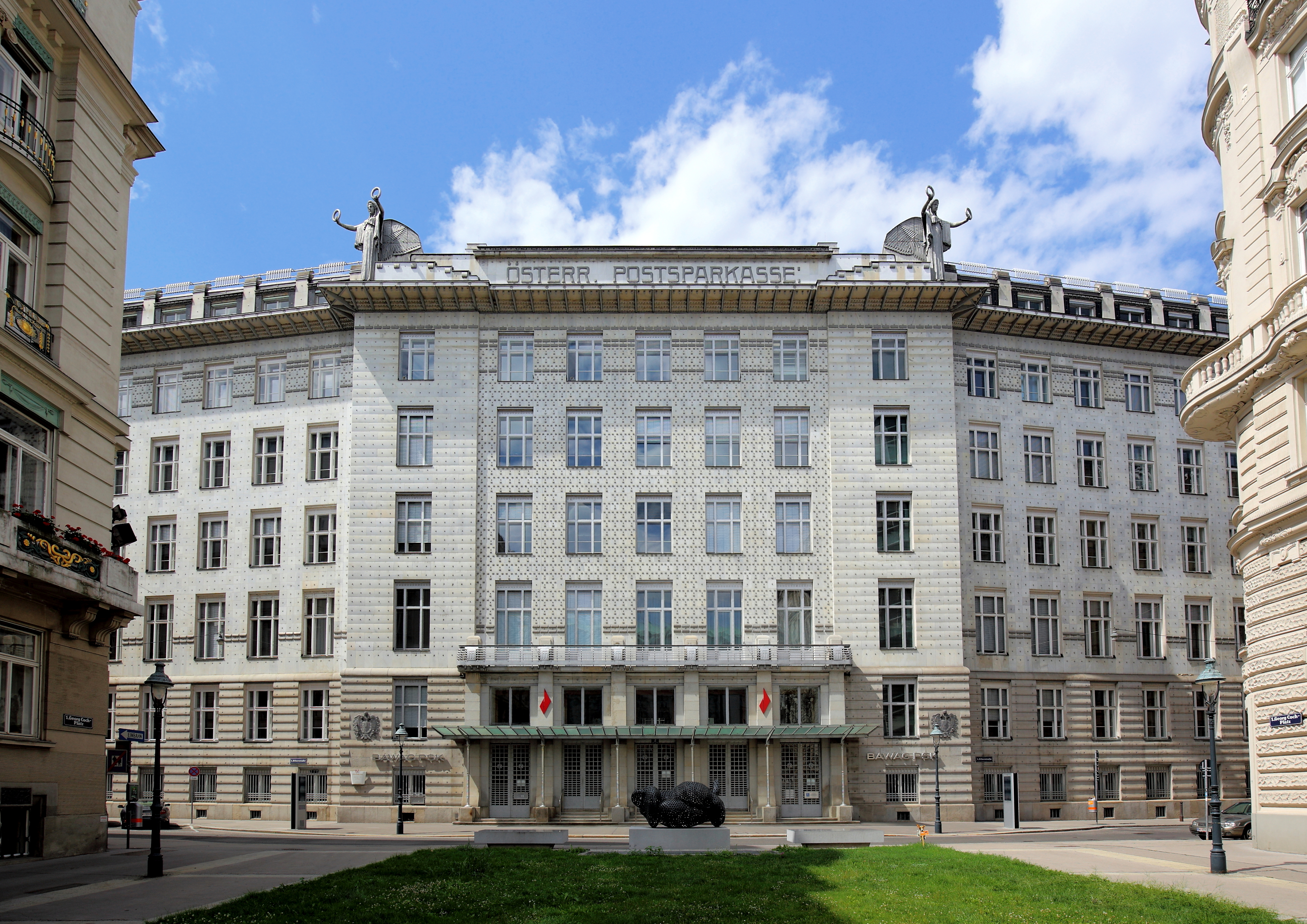
Austrian Postal Savings Bank in Vienna by Wagner (1904–1912)

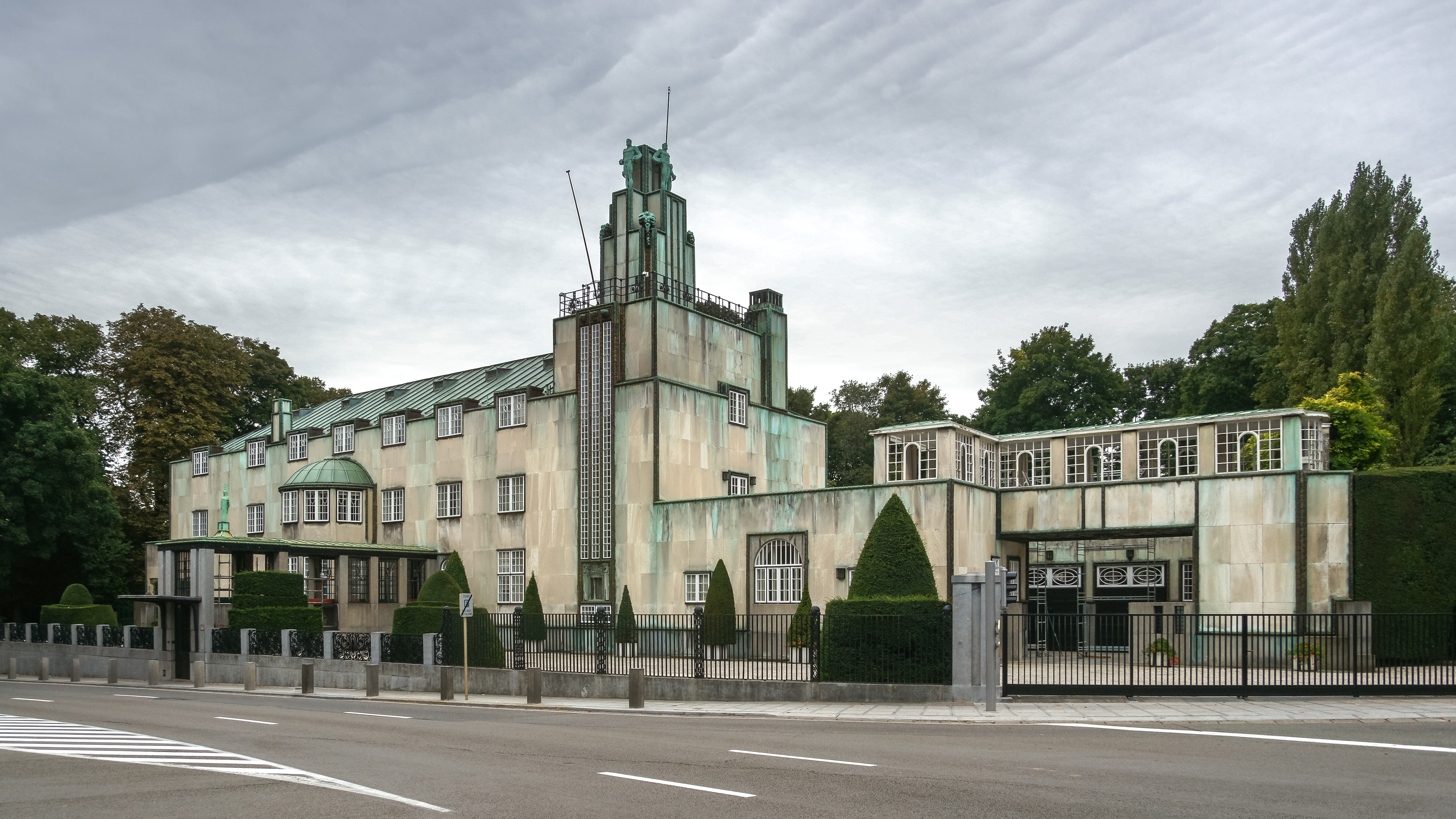
Stoclet Palace in Brussels by Josef Hoffmann (1905–1911)

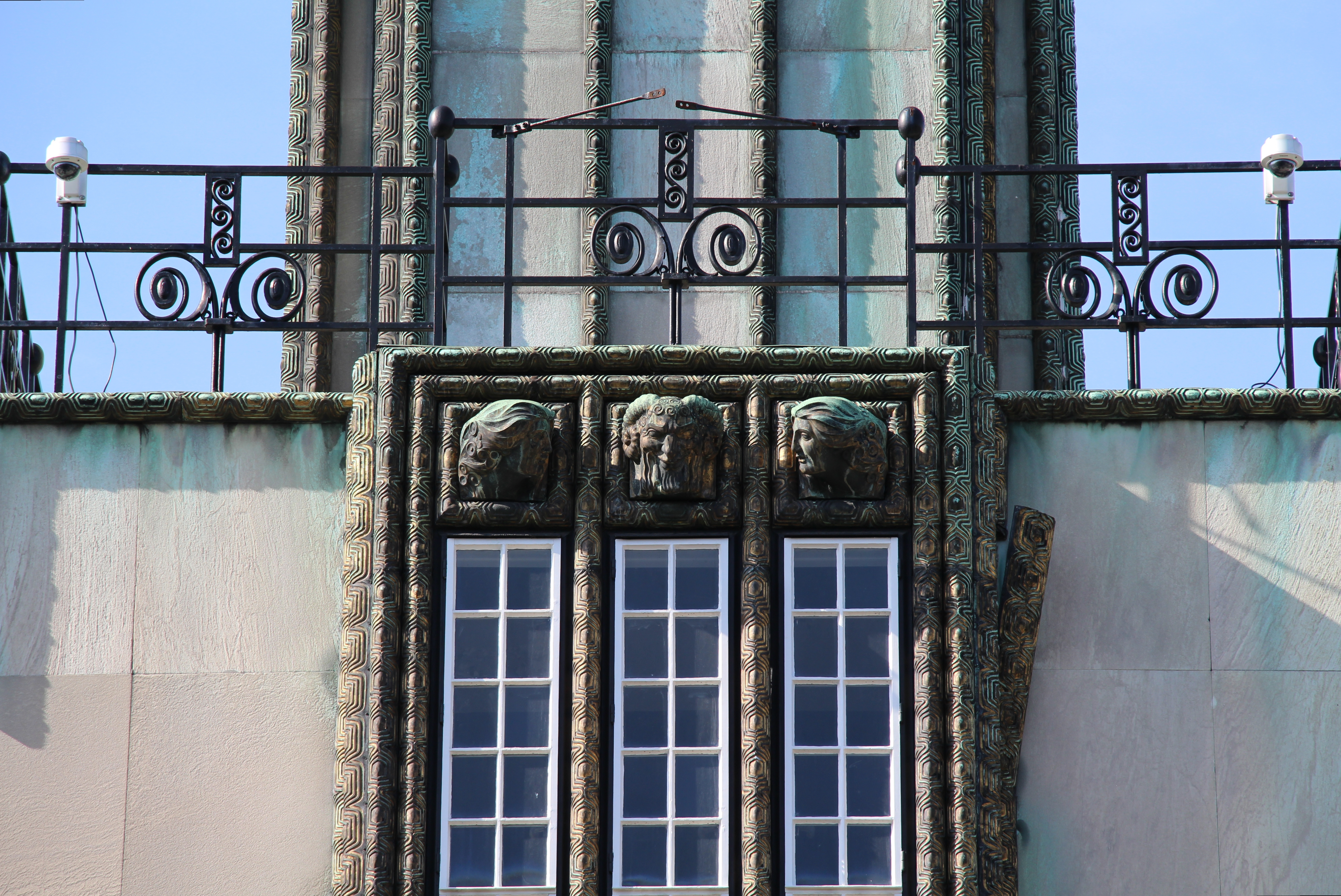
Detail of the Stoclet Palace's façade, made of reinforced concrete faced with marble veneer

=== Society of Decorative Artists (1901–1945) ===
The emergence of Art Deco was closely connected with the rise in status of decorative artists, who until late in the 19th century were considered simply artisans. The term arts décoratifs was used in France as the status of decorative arts rose, and in 1875 furniture designers, textile makers, and other craftsmen were officially recognized as artists by the French government. In 1901, the Société des artistes décorateurs (Society of Decorative Artists), or SAD, was founded, and decorative artists were given the same rights of authorship as painters and sculptors. A similar movement developed in Italy. In 1902, the first international exhibition devoted entirely to the decorative arts, the Esposizione Internazionale d'Arte Decorativa Moderna, was held in Turin.

Several new magazines devoted to decorative arts were founded in Paris, including Arts et décoration and L'Art décoratif moderne. Decorative arts sections were introduced into the annual salons of the Sociéte des artistes français, and later in the Salon d'Automne. French nationalism also played a part in the resurgence of decorative arts, as French designers felt challenged by the increasing exports of less expensive German furnishings. In 1911, SAD proposed a major new international exposition of decorative arts in 1912. No copies of old styles would be permitted, only modern works. The exhibit was postponed until 1914; and then, because of the war, until 1925, when it gave its name to the whole family of styles known as "Déco".

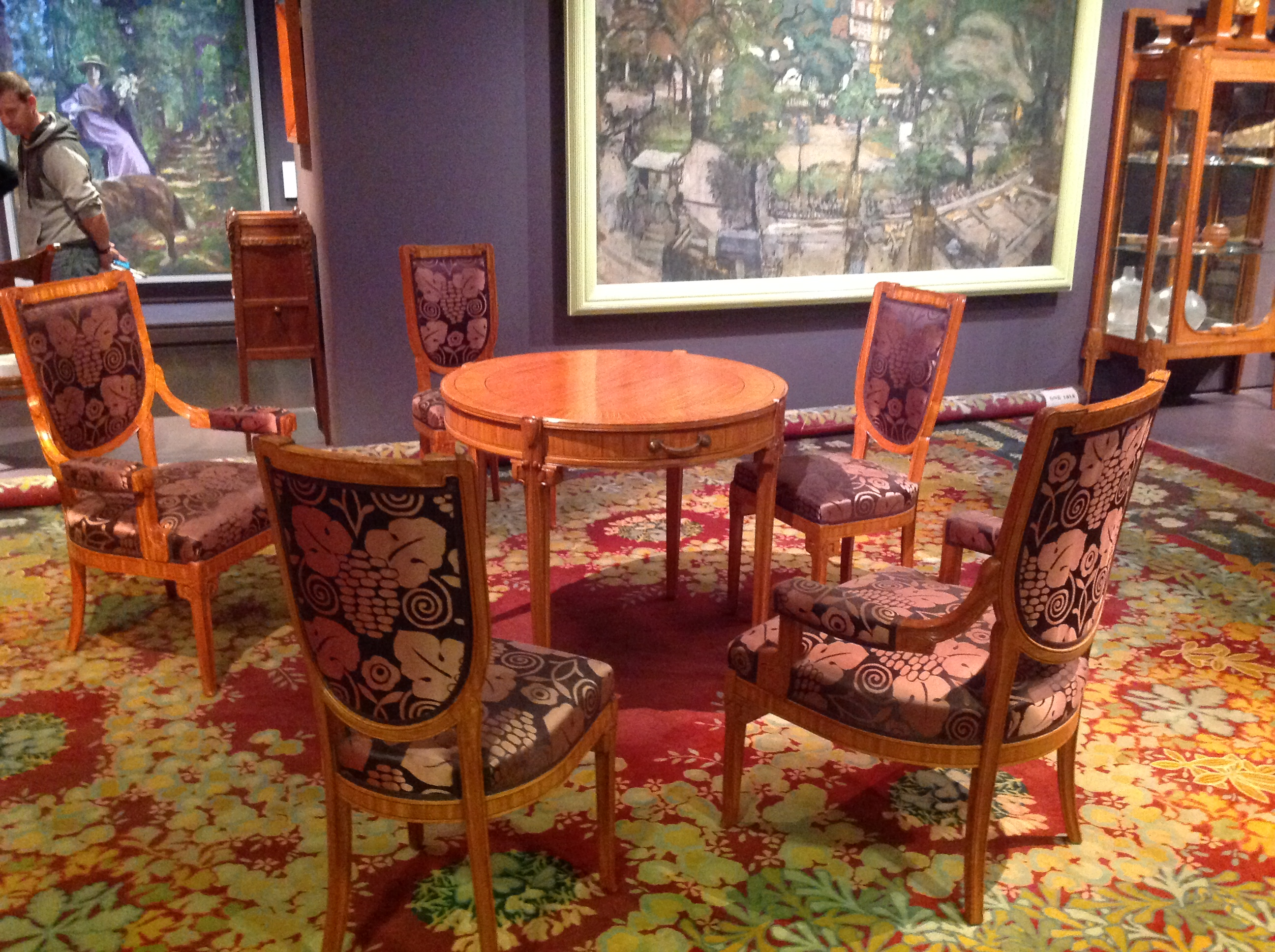
Table and chairs by Maurice Dufrêne and carpet by Paul Follot at the 1912 Salon des artistes décorateurs

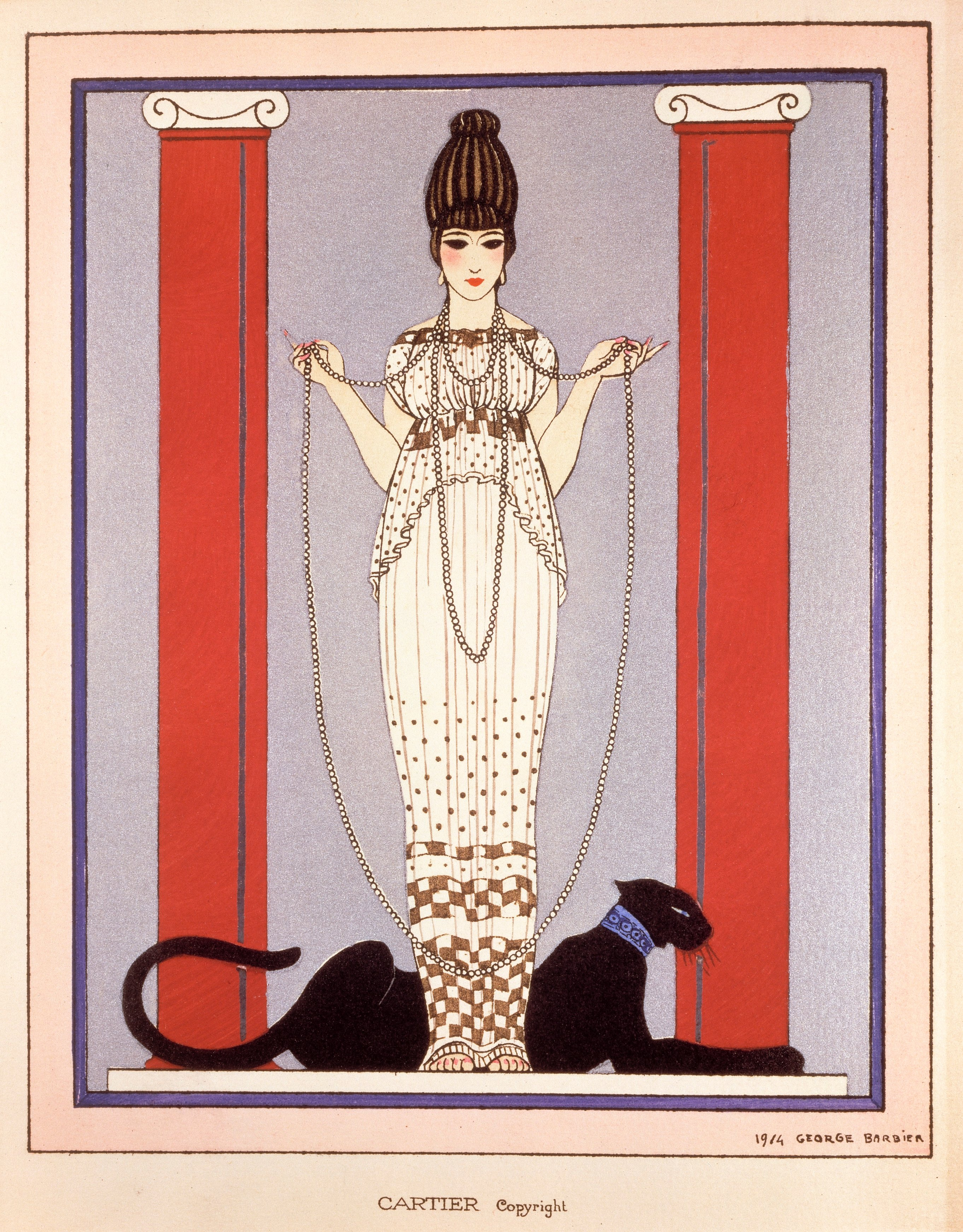
Lady with Panther by George Barbier for Louis Cartier (1914). Display card commissioned by Cartier shows a woman in a Paul Poiret gown.

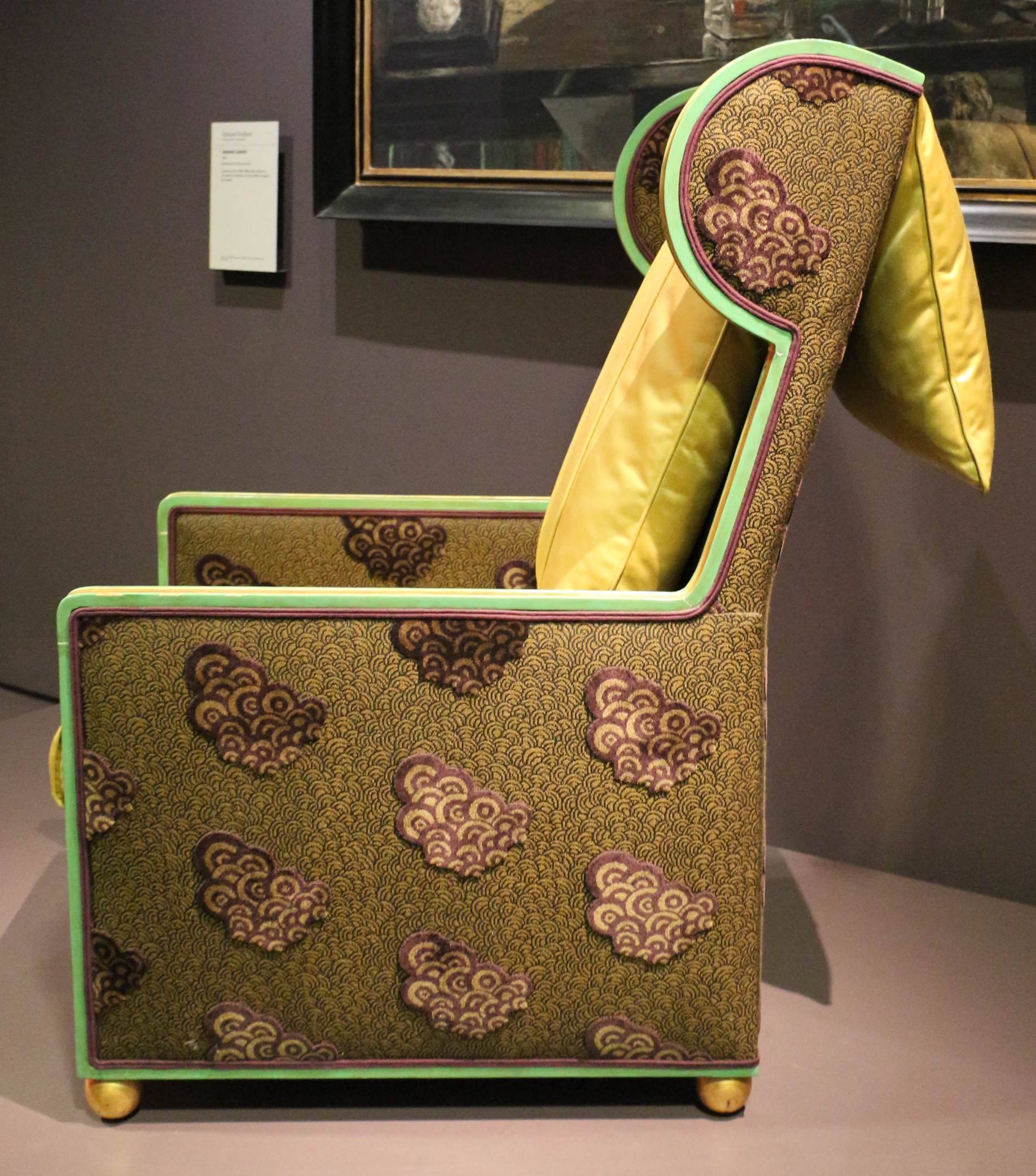
Armchair by Émile-Jacques Ruhlmann (1914), now in the Musée d'Orsay, Paris

Parisian department stores and fashion designers also played an important part in the rise of Art Deco. Prominent businesses such as silverware firm Christofle, glass designer René Lalique, and the jewellers Louis Cartier and Boucheron began designing products in more modern styles. Beginning in 1900, department stores recruited decorative artists to work in their design studios. The decoration of the 1912 Salon d'Automne was entrusted to the department store Printemps, and that year it created its own workshop, Primavera.

By 1920, Primavera employed more than 300 artists, whose styles ranged from updated versions of Louis XIV, Louis XVI, and especially Louis Philippe furniture made by Louis Süe and the Primavera workshop, to more modern forms from the workshop of the Au Louvre department store. Other designers, including Émile-Jacques Ruhlmann and Paul Follot, refused to use mass production, insisting that each piece be made individually. The early Art Deco style featured luxurious and exotic materials such as ebony, ivory and silk, very bright colours and stylized motifs, particularly baskets and bouquets of flowers of all colours, giving a modernist look.

=== Salon d'Automne (1903–1914) ===
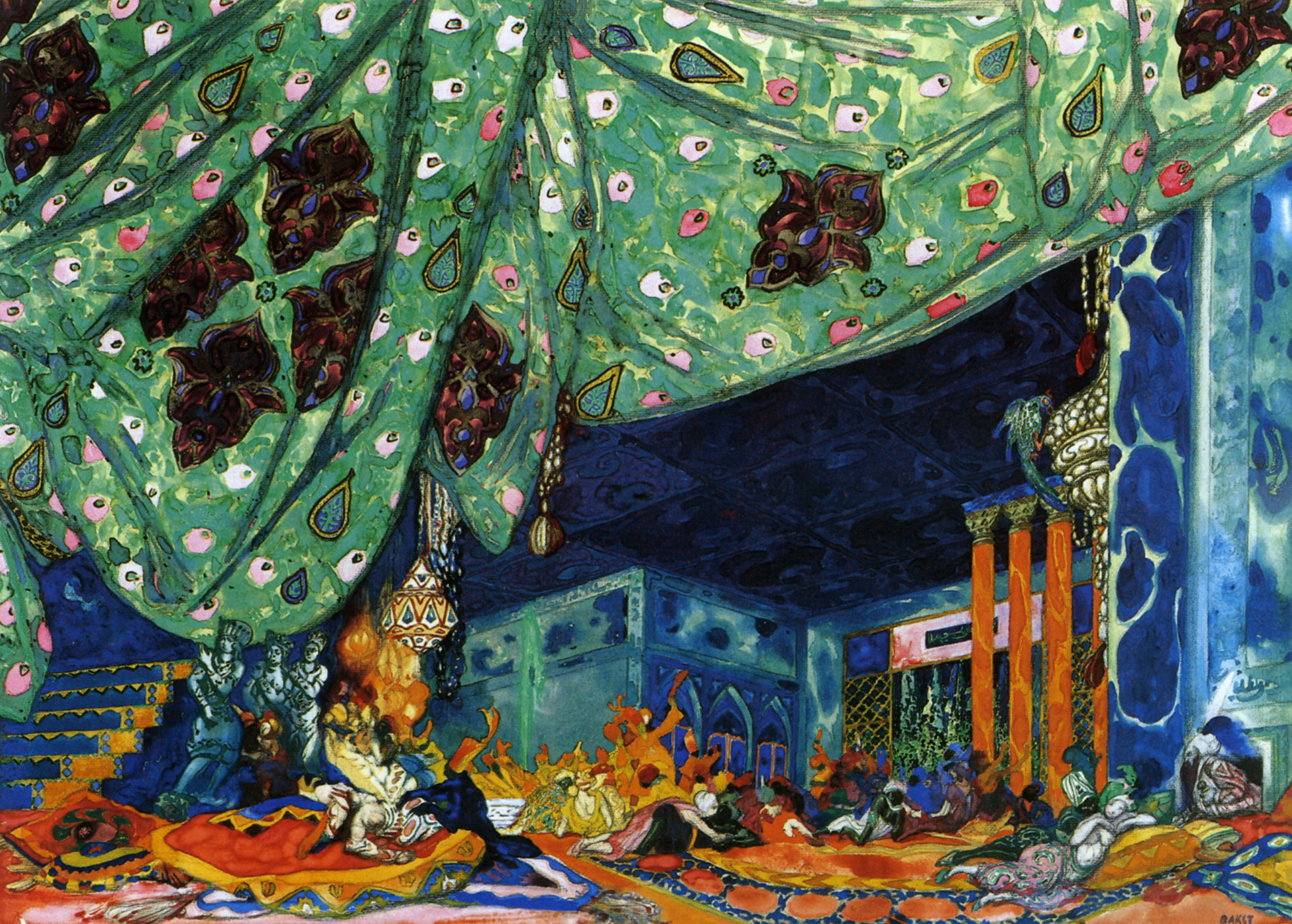
Set for Nikolai Rimsky-Korsakov's ballet Sheherazade by Léon Bakst (1910)

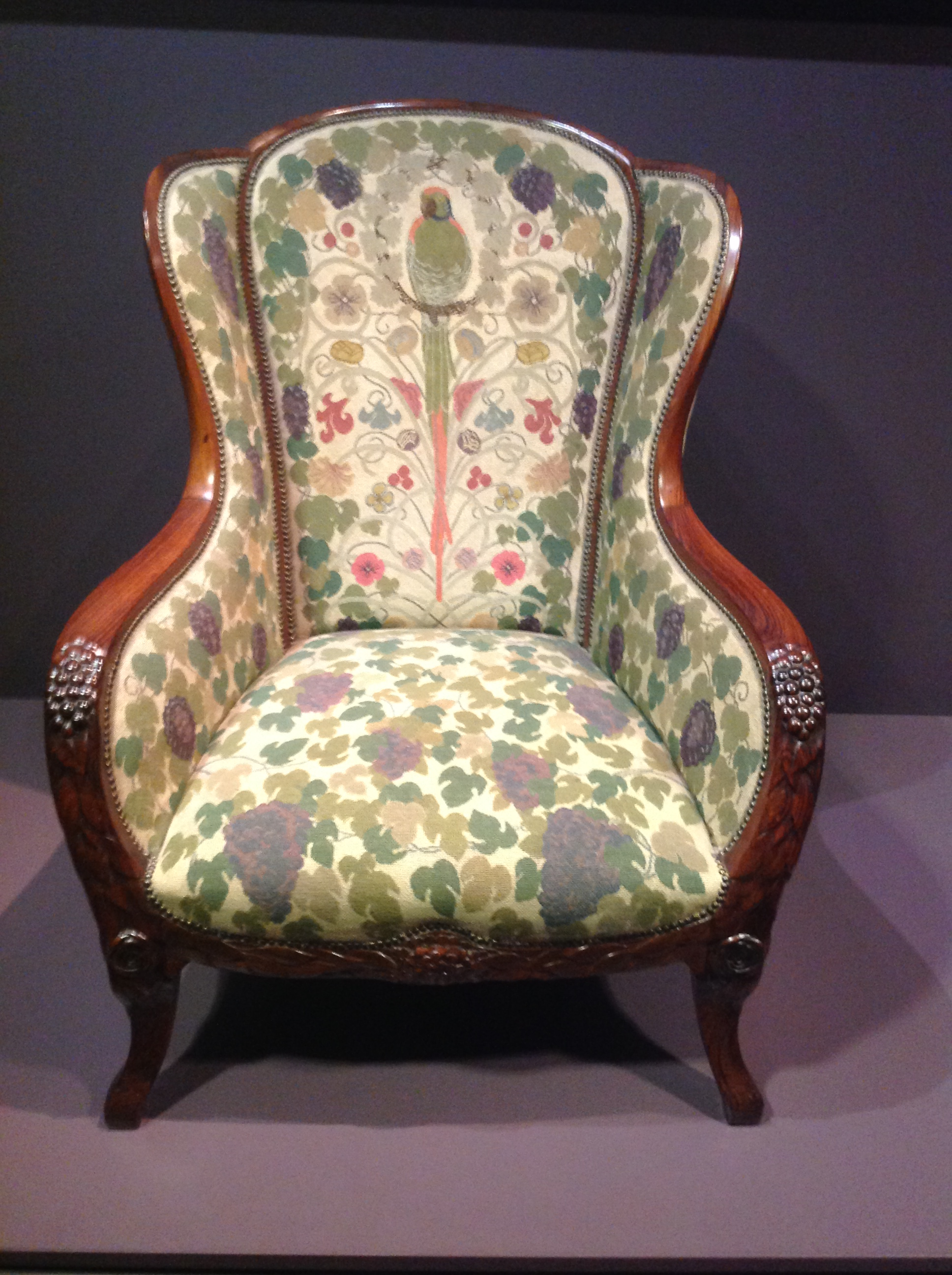
Art Deco armchair made for art collector Jacques Doucet (1912–13)

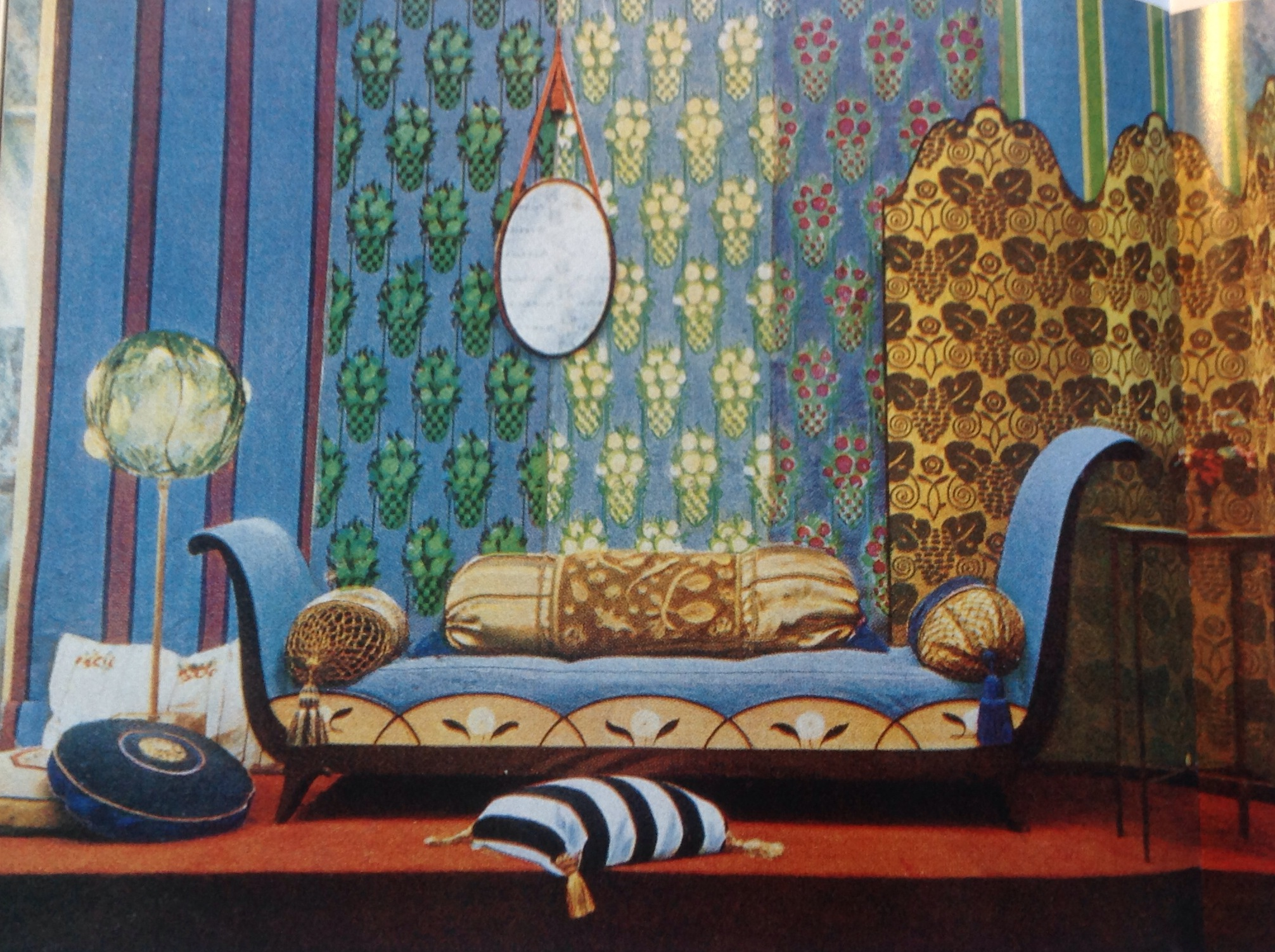
Display of early Art Deco furnishings by the Atelier français at the 1913 Salon d'Automne from Art et décoration magazine (1914)

At its birth between 1910 and 1914, Art Deco was an explosion of colours, featuring bright and often clashing hues, frequently in floral designs, presented in furniture upholstery, carpets, screens, wallpaper and fabrics. Many colourful works, including chairs and a table by Maurice Dufrêne and a bright Gobelin carpet by Paul Follot were presented at the 1912 Salon des artistes décorateurs. In 1912–1913 designer Adrien Karbowsky made a floral chair with a parrot design for the hunting lodge of art collector Jacques Doucet. The furniture designers Louis Süe and André Mare made their first appearance at the 1912 exhibit, under the name of the Atelier français, combining polychromatic fabrics with exotic and expensive materials, including ebony and ivory. After World War I, they became one of the most prominent French interior design firms, producing the furniture for the first-class salons and cabins of the French transatlantic ocean liners.

The vivid hues of Art Deco came from many sources, including the exotic set designs by Léon Bakst for the Ballets Russes, which caused a sensation in Paris just before World War I. Some of the colours were inspired by the earlier Fauvism movement led by Henri Matisse; others by the Orphism of painters such as Sonia Delaunay; others by the movement known as Les Nabis, and in the work of symbolist painter Odilon Redon, who designed fireplace screens and other decorative objects. Bright shades were a feature of the work of fashion designer Paul Poiret, whose work influenced both Art Deco fashion and interior design.

=== Théâtre des Champs-Élysées (1910–1913) ===
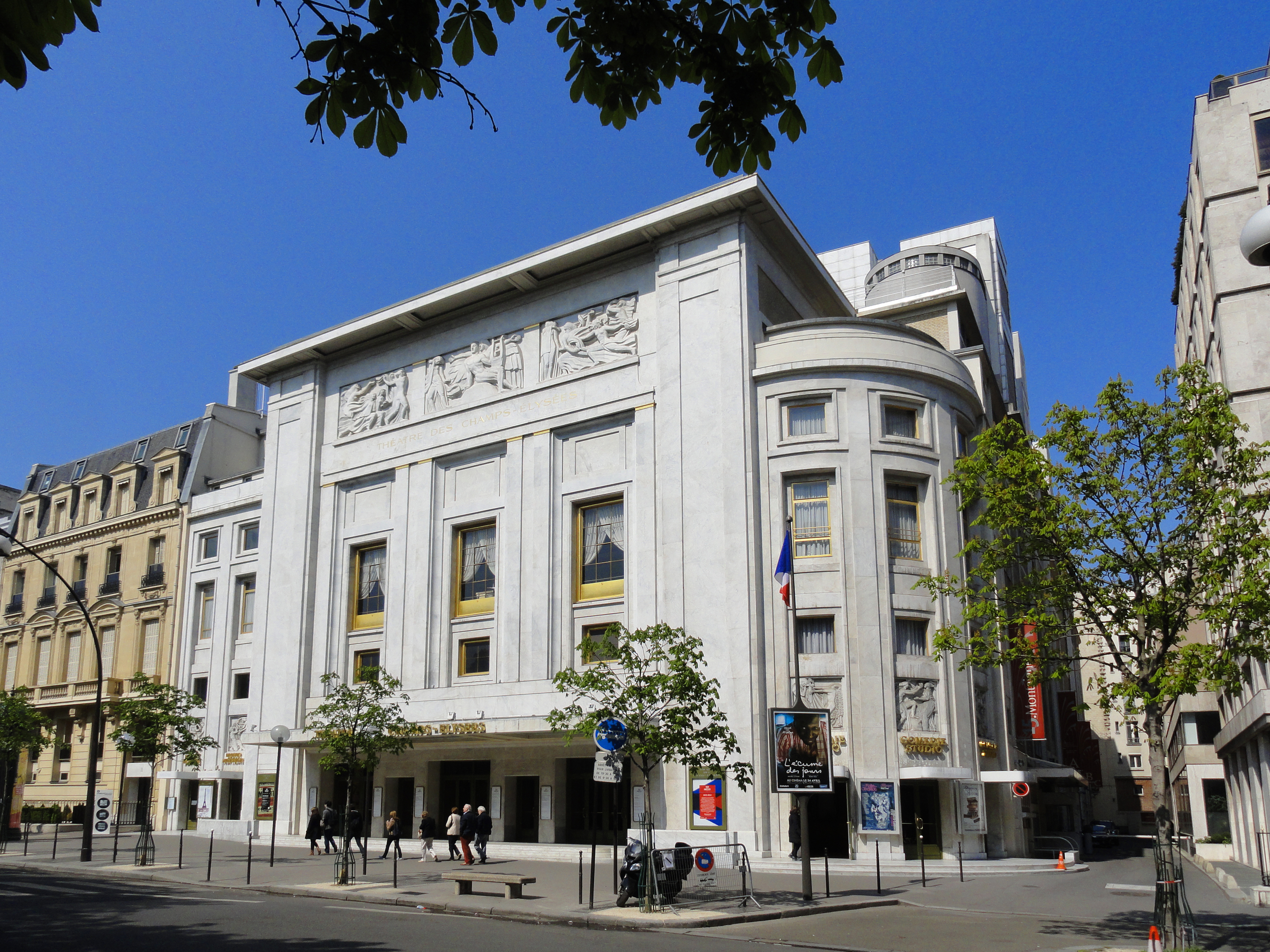
Théâtre des Champs-Élysées by Auguste Perret at 15, avenue Montaigne, Paris (1910–1913). Reinforced concrete gave architects the ability to create new forms and bigger spaces.

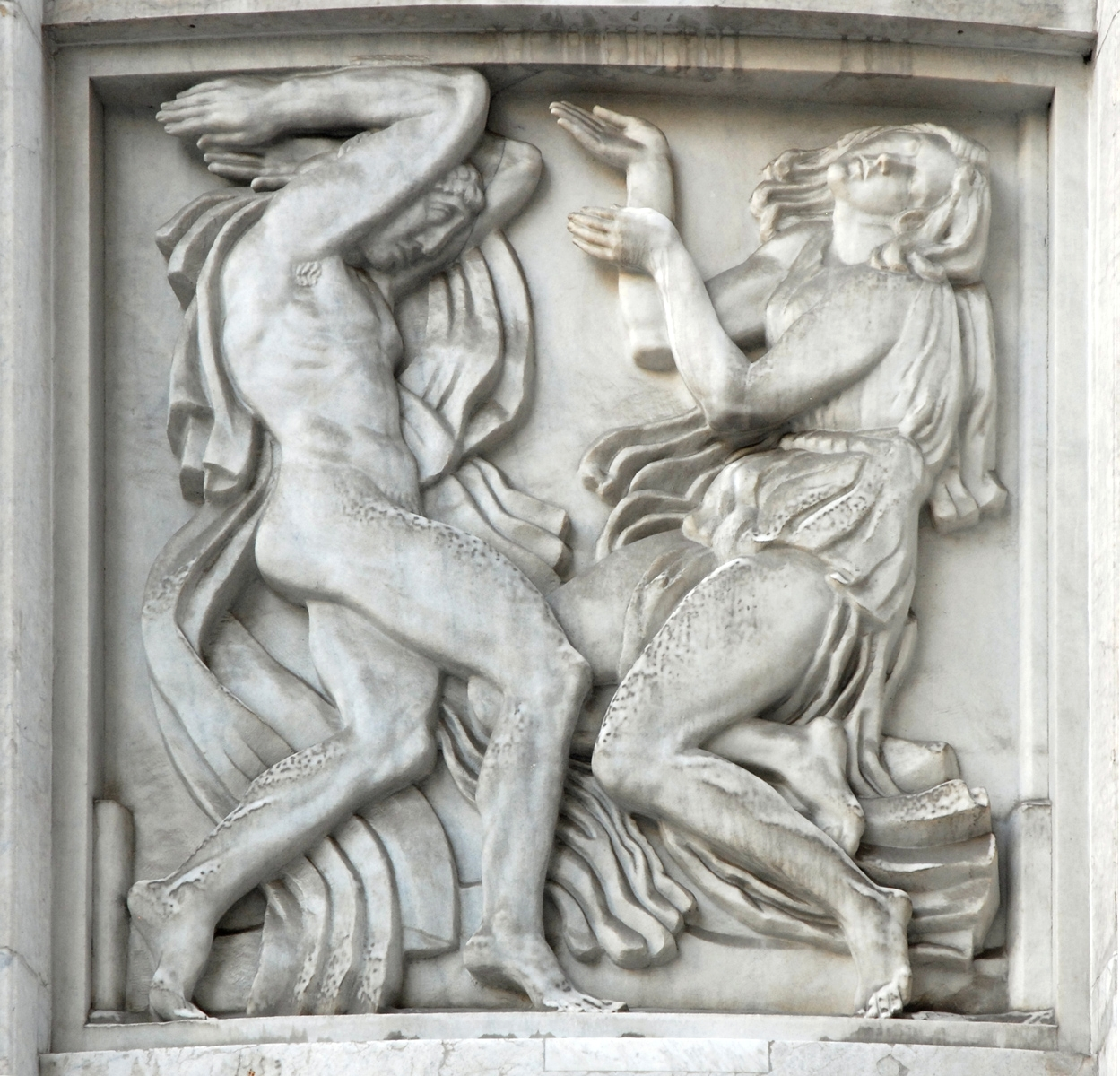
La Danse, bas-relief on the façade of the Théâtre des Champs-Élysées by Antoine Bourdelle (1912)

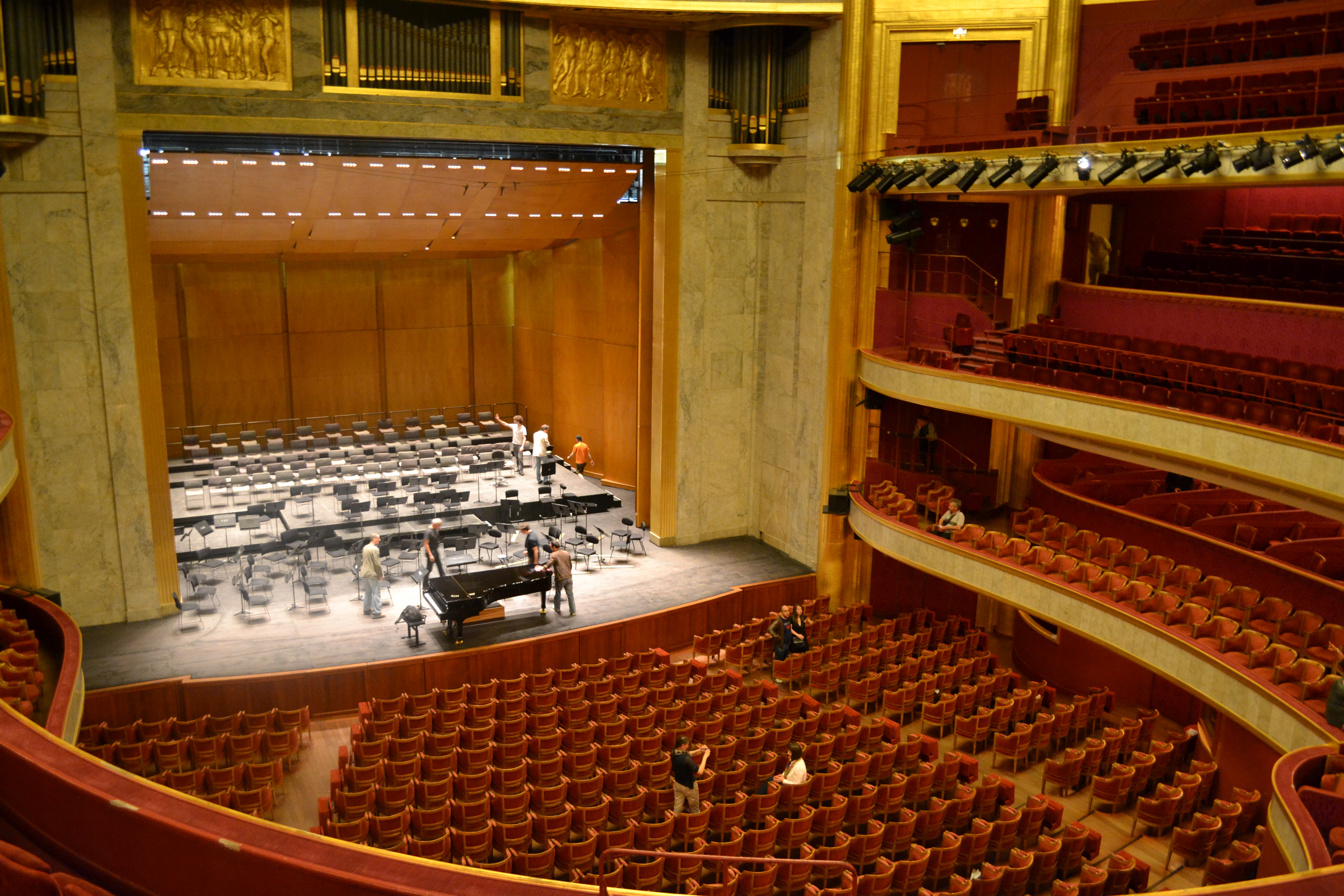
Interior of the Théâtre des Champs-Élysées, with Bourdelle's bas-reliefs over the stage

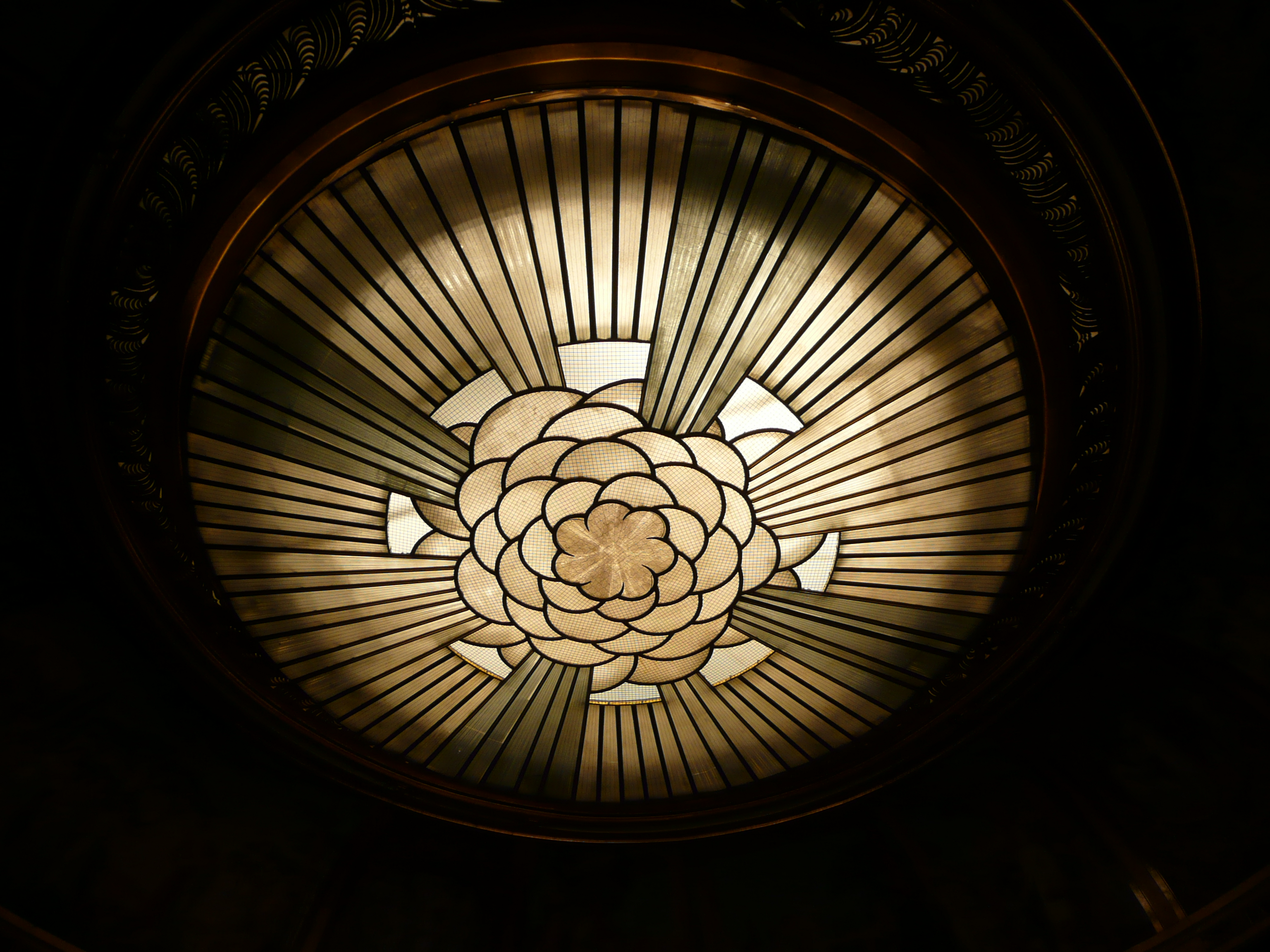
Dome of the Theater, with Art Deco rose design by Maurice Denis
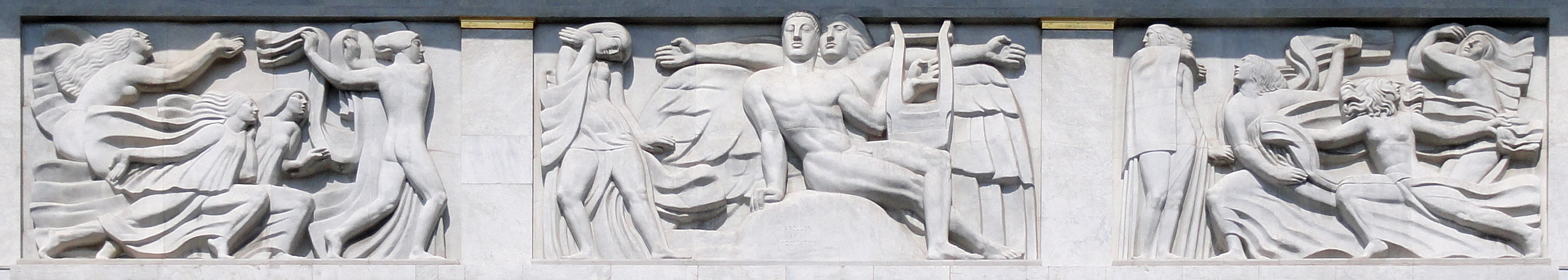
Apollon et sa méditation entourée des 9 muses (Apollo and His Meditation Surrounded by the 9 Muses), bas-relief on the façade of the Théâtre des Champs-Élysées by Bourdelle (1910–1912). This work represents one of the earliest examples of what became known as Art Deco sculpture.

The Théâtre des Champs-Élysées (1910–1913), by Auguste Perret, was the first landmark Art Deco building completed in Paris. Previously, reinforced concrete was only used for industrial and apartment buildings, Perret had built the first modern reinforced-concrete apartment building in Paris on rue Benjamin Franklin in 1903–04. Henri Sauvage, another important future Art Deco architect, built another in 1904 at 7, rue Trétaigne (1904).

From 1908 to 1910, the 21-year-old Le Corbusier worked as a draftsman in Perret's office, learning the techniques of concrete construction. Perret's building had clean rectangular form, geometric decoration and straight lines, the future trademarks of Art Deco. The décor of the theatre was also revolutionary; the façade was decorated with high reliefs by Antoine Bourdelle, a dome by Maurice Denis, paintings by Édouard Vuillard, and an Art Deco curtain by Ker-Xavier Roussel. The theatre became the venue for many of the first performances of the Ballets Russes. Perret and Sauvage became the leading Art Deco architects in Paris in the 1920s.

=== Cubism ===
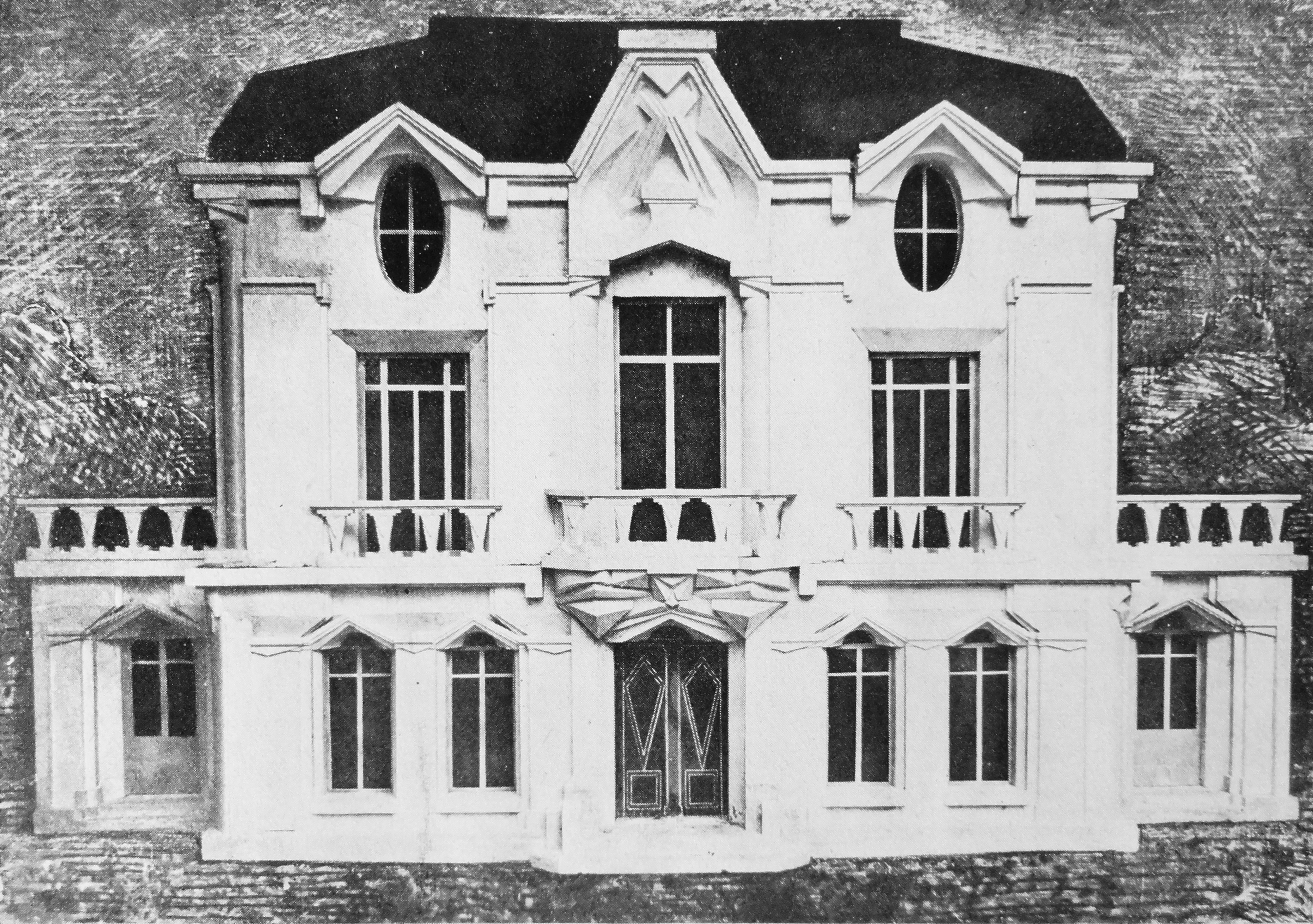
Design for the façade of La Maison Cubiste (Cubist House) by Raymond Duchamp-Villon (1912)

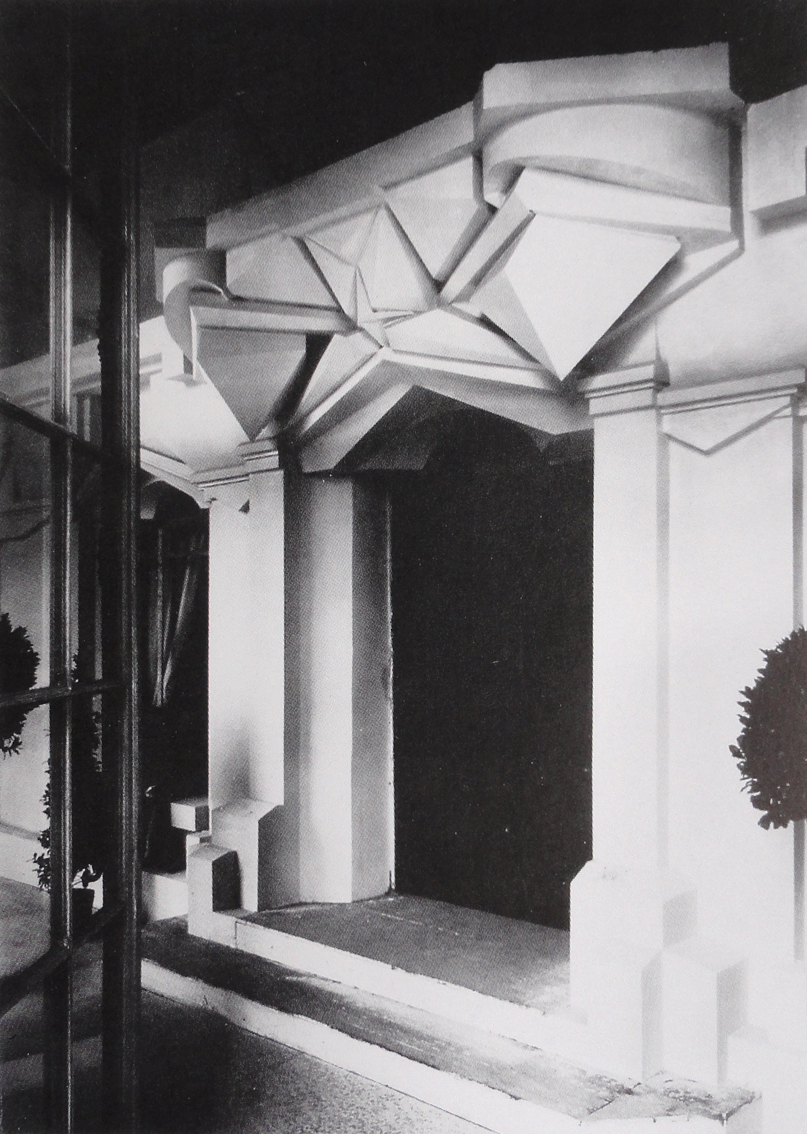
Detail of the entrance of La Maison Cubiste at the 1912 Salon d'Automne

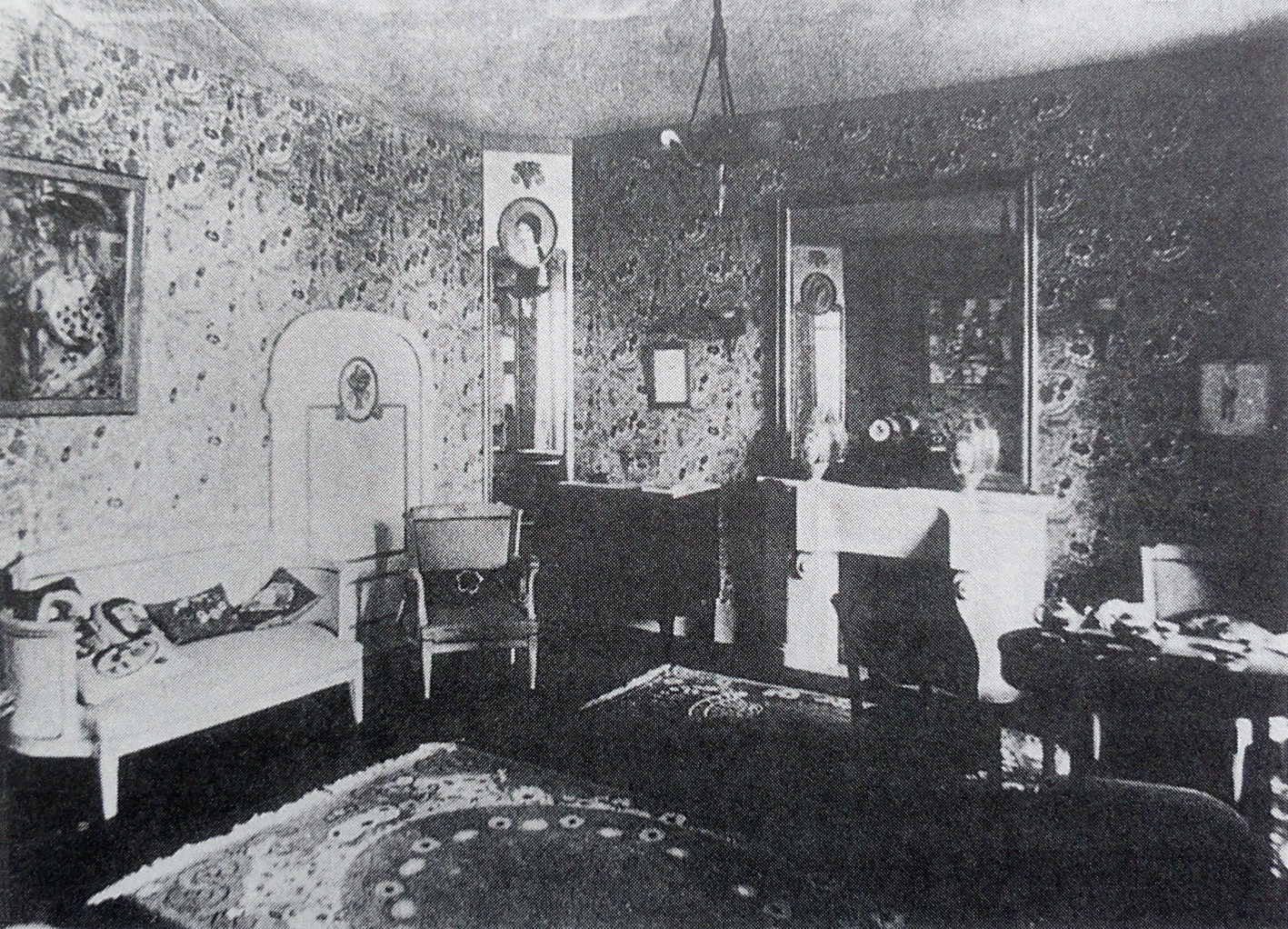
Le Salon Bourgeois, designed by André Mare inside La Maison Cubiste, in the decorative arts section of the 1912 Salon d'Automne. Metzinger's Femme à l'Éventail can be seen hanging on the left wall.

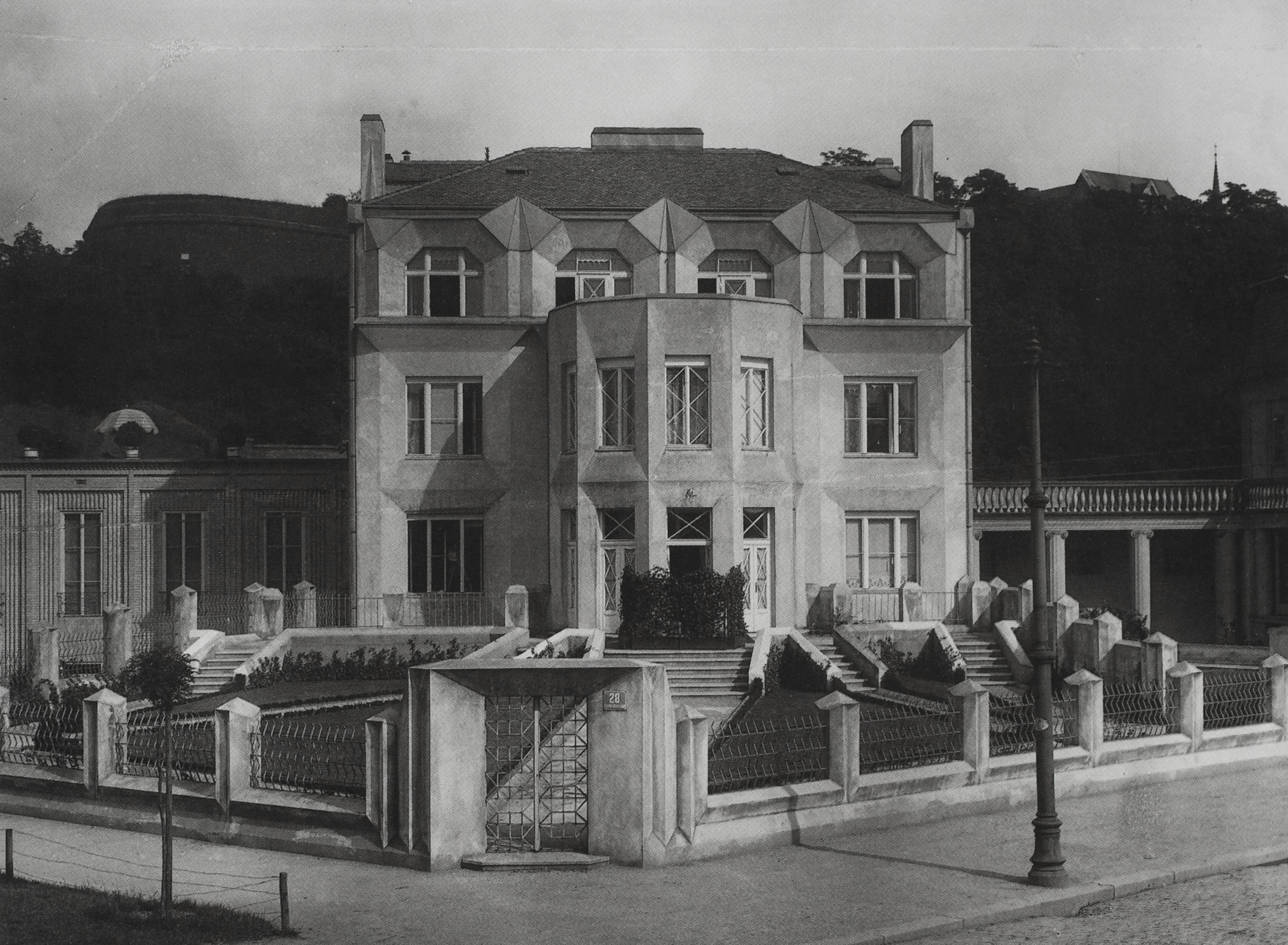
Cubist villa at 3-49 Libušina Street, Vyšehrad (Prague), by Josef Chochol (1912–13). Chochol was one of three Czech architects (members of the Mánes Union of Fine Arts), with Pavel Janák and Josef Gočár, influenced by Cubism.

Danseuse (Femme à l'éventail, Femme à la cruche) by Joseph Csaky (1912), original plaster, exhibited at the 1912 Salon d'Automne and the 1914 Salon des Indépendants, a proto-Art Deco sculpture

The art movement known as Cubism appeared in France between 1907 and 1912, influencing the development of Art Deco. Alistair Duncan wrote:

"Cubism, in some bastardized form or other, became the lingua franca of the era's decorative artists."

The Cubists were themselves under the influence of Paul Cézanne, and interested in the simplification of forms to their geometric essentials: the cylinder, the sphere, and the cone.

In 1912, the artists of the Section d'Or exhibited works considerably more accessible to the general public than the analytical Cubism of Picasso and Braque. The Cubist vocabulary was poised to attract fashion, furniture and interior designers.

In the Art Décoratif section of the 1912 Salon d'Automne, an architectural installation was exhibited known as La Maison Cubiste. The façade was designed by Raymond Duchamp-Villon. The décor of the house was by André Mare. La Maison Cubiste was a furnished installation with a façade, a staircase, wrought iron banisters, a bedroom, a living room—the Salon Bourgeois, where paintings by Albert Gleizes, Jean Metzinger, Marie Laurencin, Marcel Duchamp, Fernand Léger and Roger de La Fresnaye were hung. Thousands of spectators at the salon passed through the full-scale model.

The façade of the house, designed by Duchamp-Villon, was not very radical by modern standards; the lintels and pediments had prismatic shapes, but otherwise the façade resembled an ordinary house of the period. For the two rooms, Mare designed the wallpaper, which featured stylized roses and floral patterns, along with upholstery, furniture and carpets, all with flamboyant and colourful motifs. It was a distinct break from traditional décor. The critic Emile Sedeyn described Mare's work in the magazine Art et Décoration: "He does not embarrass himself with simplicity, for he multiplies flowers wherever they can be put. The effect he seeks is obviously one of picturesqueness and gaiety. He achieves it." The Cubist element was provided by the paintings. The installation was attacked by some critics as extremely radical, which helped make for its success. This architectural installation was subsequently exhibited at the 1913 Armory Show, New York City, Chicago and Boston. Thanks largely to the exhibition, the term "Cubist" began to be applied to anything modern, from women's haircuts to clothing to theater performances."

The Cubist influence continued within Art Deco, even as Deco branched out in many other directions.

Cubism's adumbrated geometry became coin of the realm in the 1920s. Art Deco's development of Cubism's selective geometry into a wider array of shapes carried Cubism as a pictorial taxonomy to a much broader audience and wider appeal. (Richard Harrison Martin, Metropolitan Museum of Art)

== Influences ==
=== Pre-World War I European styles ===
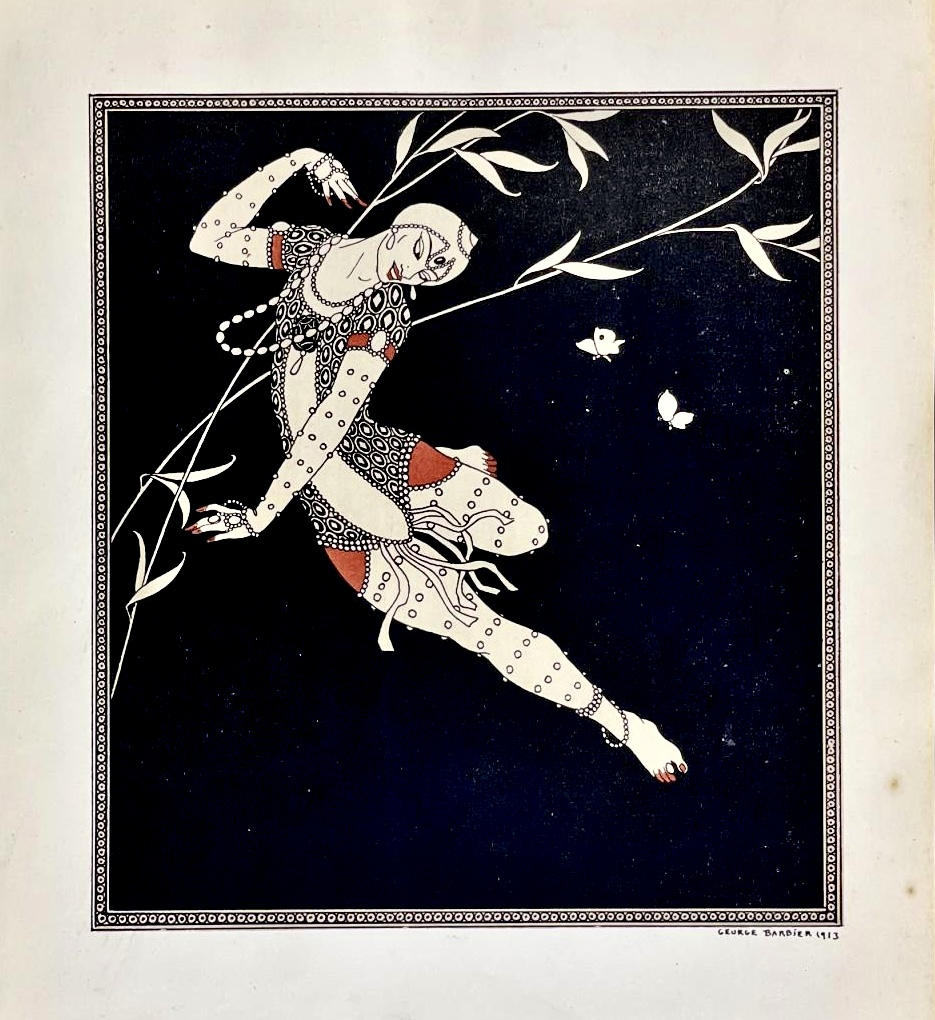
Ballets Russes influences – Drawing of the dancer Vaslav Nijinsky, by Paris fashion artist Georges Barbier (1913)

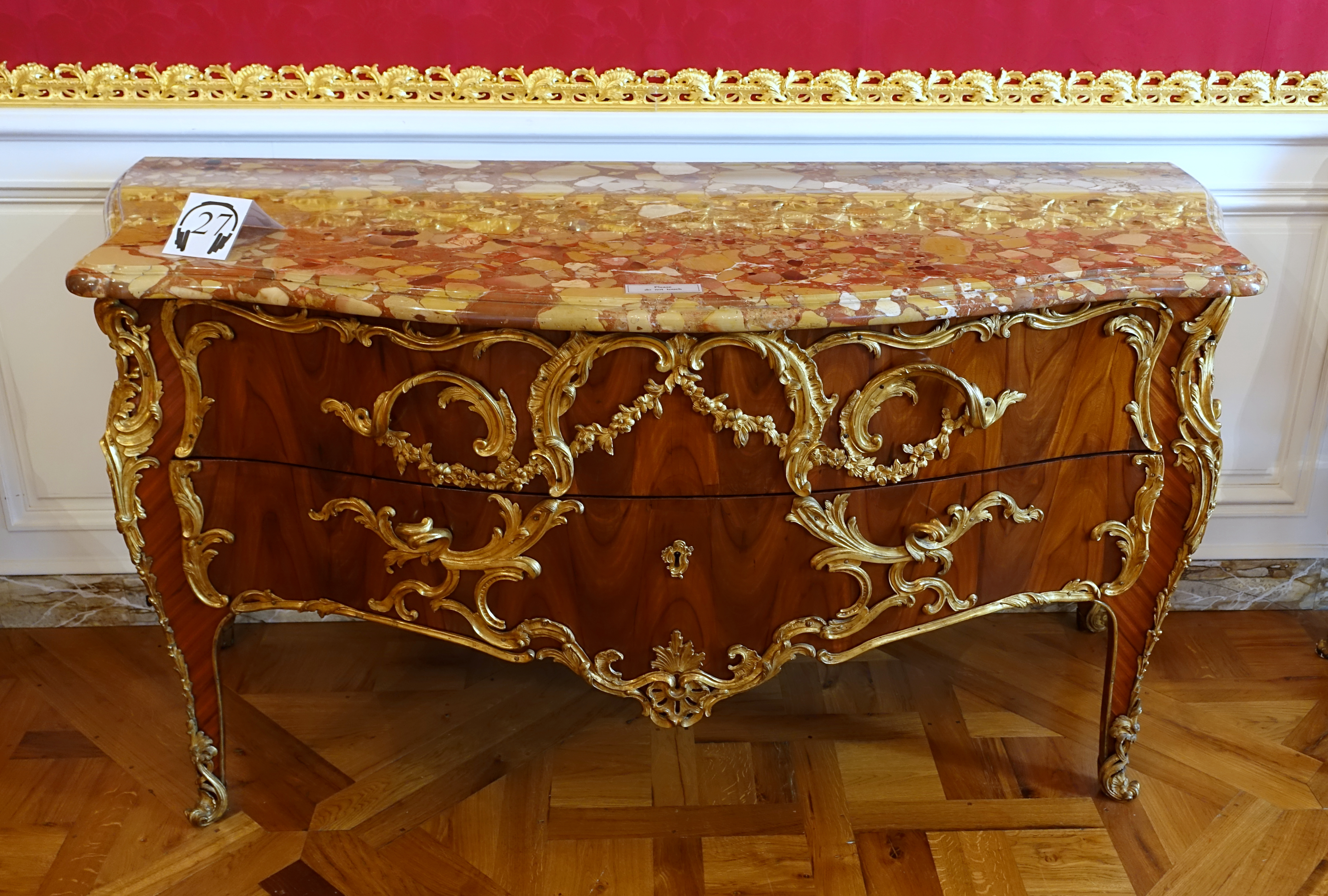
Rococo – Chest of drawers, by Jacques Dubois (1750–1755), various wood types and gilt bronze mounts, Waddesdon Manor, Buckinghamshire, UK

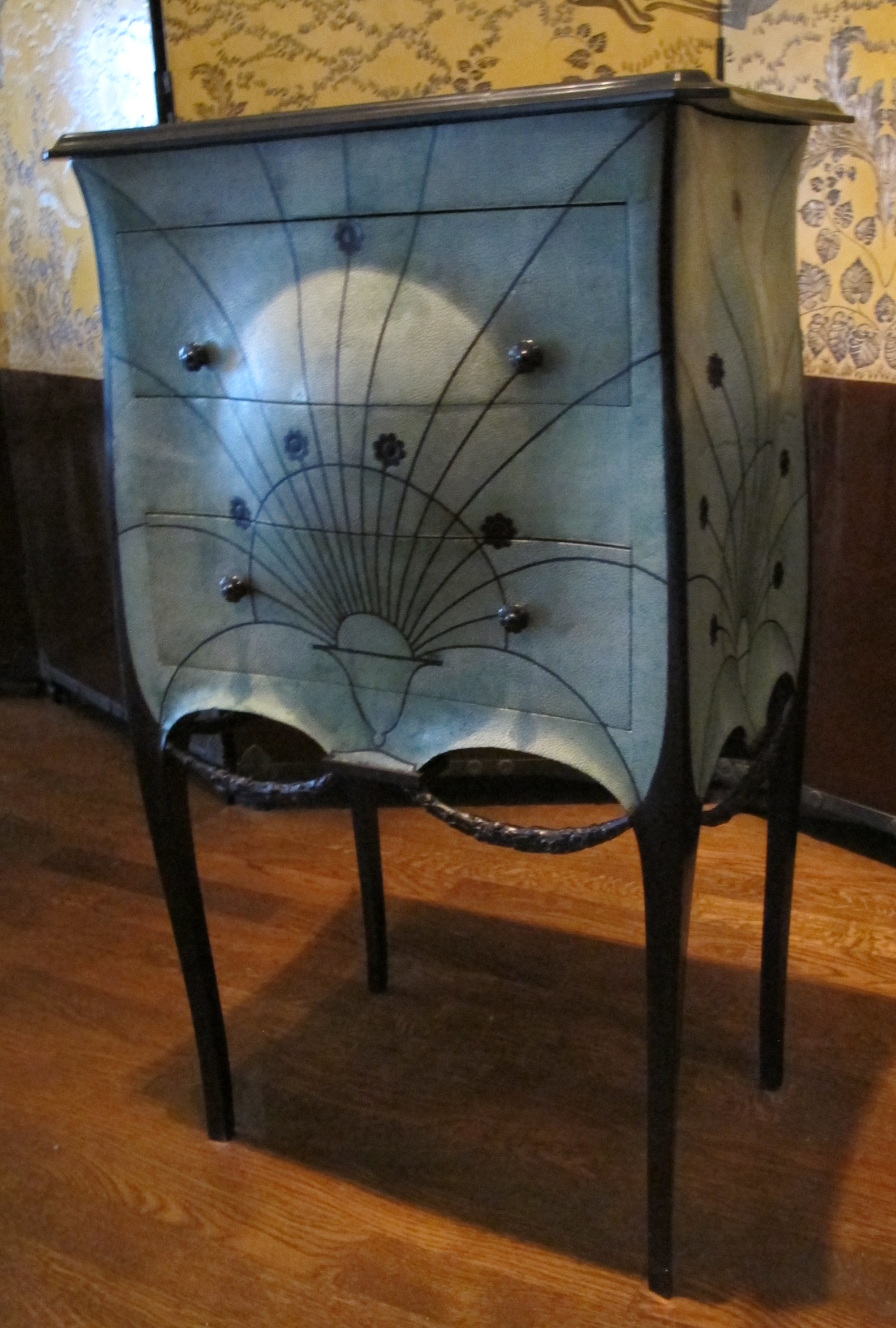
Rococo influences – Commode, by Paul Iribarne Garay (c. 1912), mahogany and tulip wood frame, slate top, green-tinted shagreen upholstery, ebony knobs, base and garlands, Museum of Decorative Arts, Paris

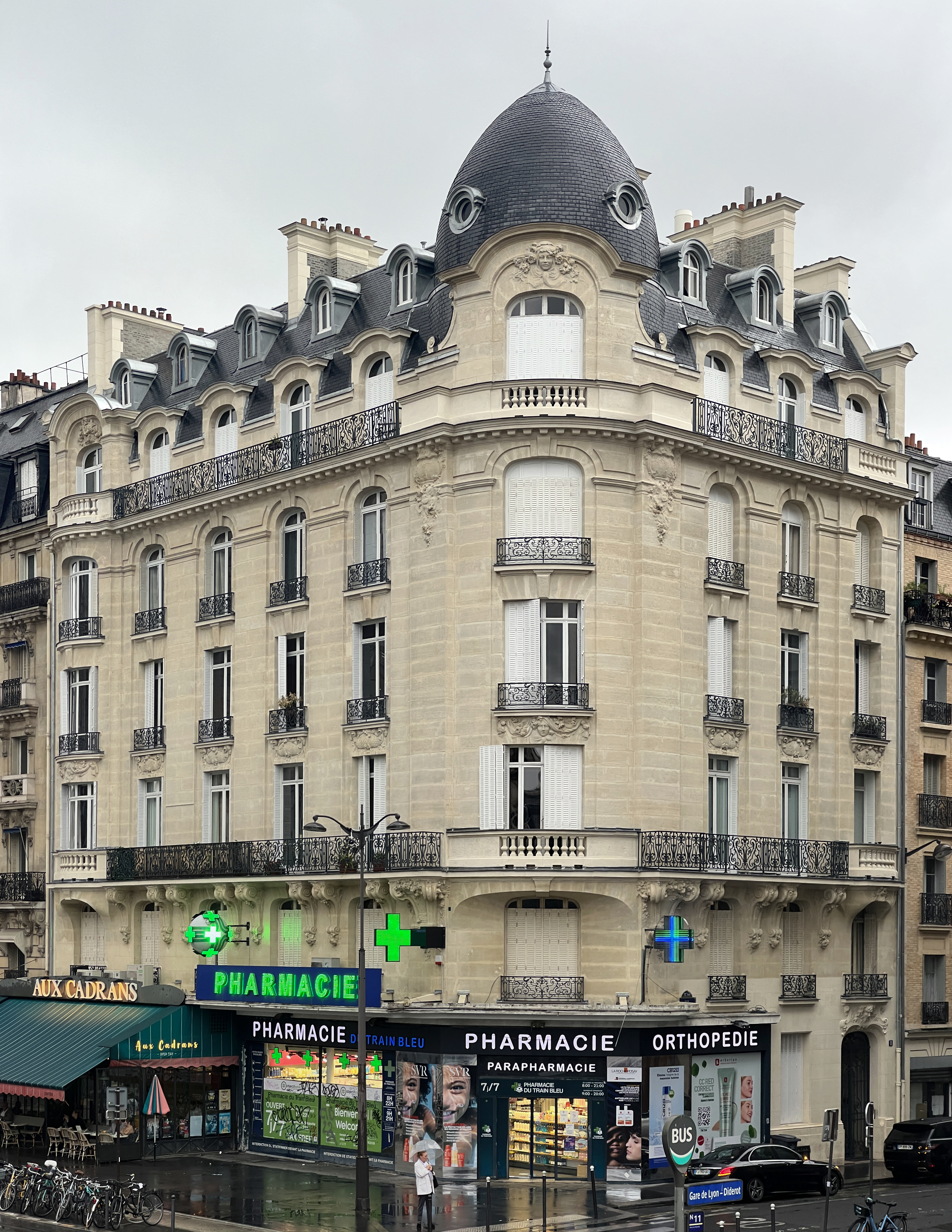
Beaux Arts architecture – Boulevard Diderot no. 21, Paris, unknown architect (c. 1910)

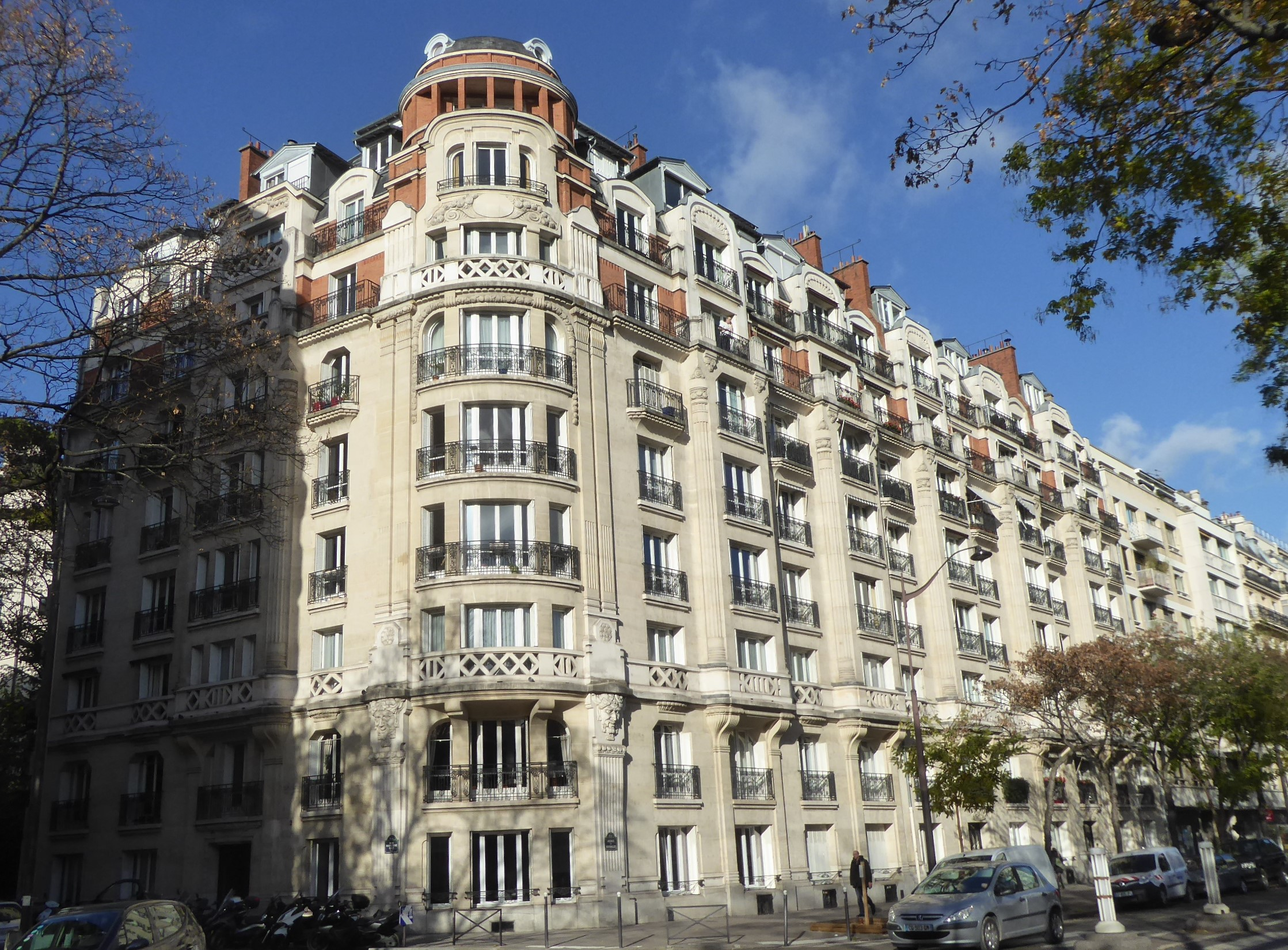
Beaux Arts influences – Avenue de Versailles no. 70–72, Paris, "Modern" decor in an established typology, designed by Paul Delaplace and sculpted by Jean Boucher (1928)

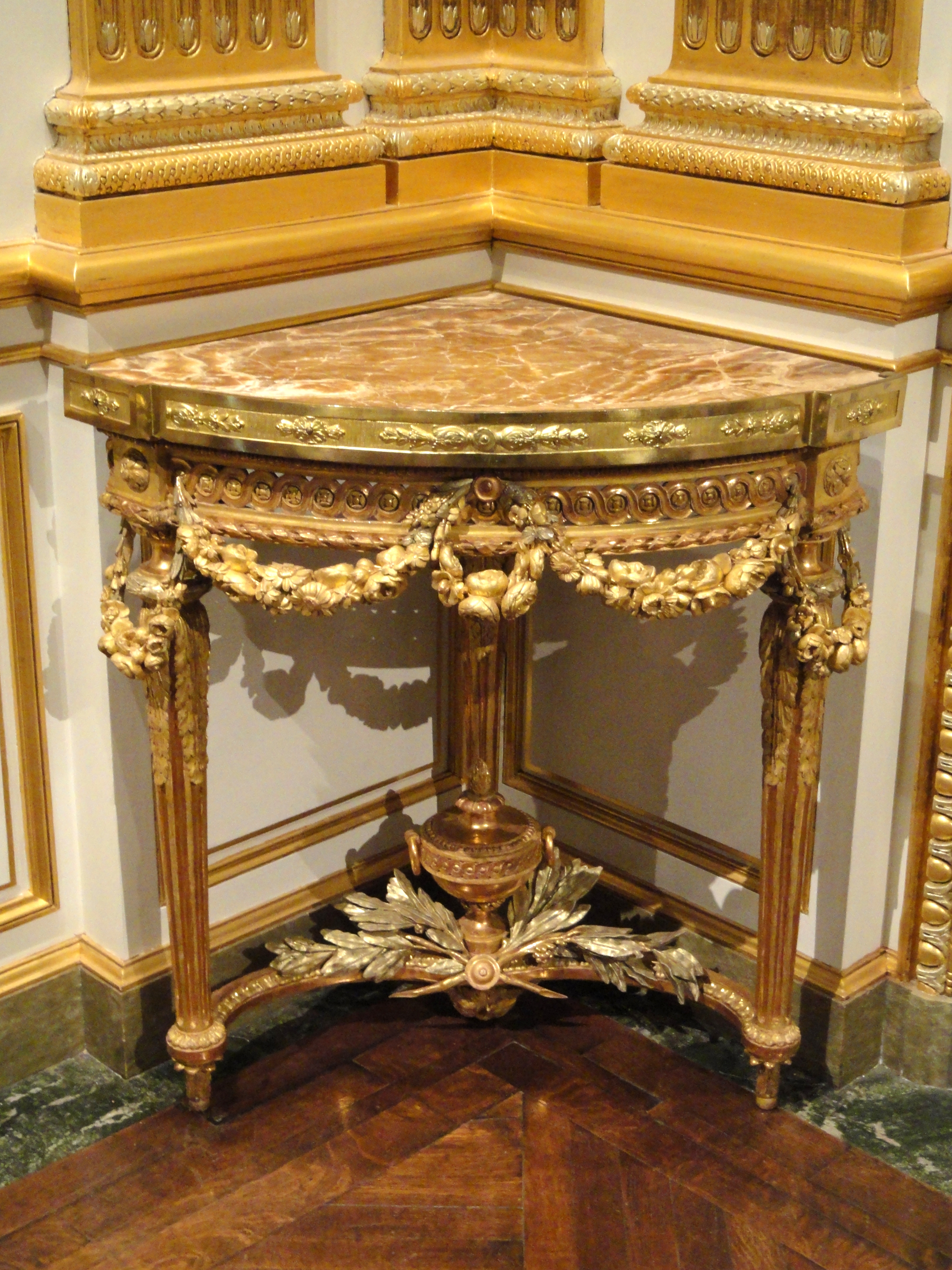
Louis XVI style – Corner table, by Jean-François Chalgrin (1770), gilded wood, Corcoran Gallery of Art, Washington, D.C.

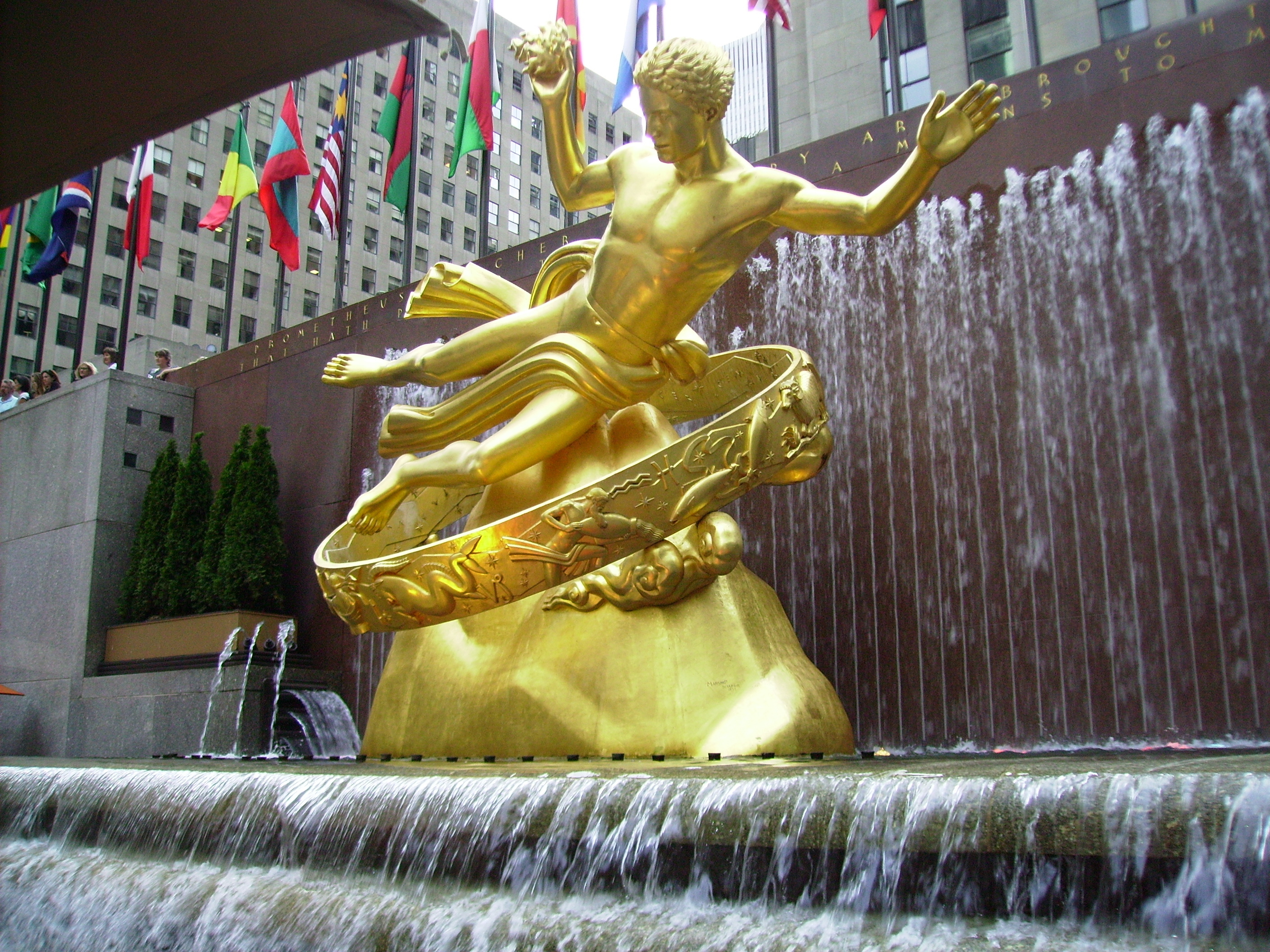
Neoclassical influences – Prometheus, a stylised Art Deco update of classical sculpture, by Paul Manship (1936), gilded bronze, Rockefeller Center, New York City

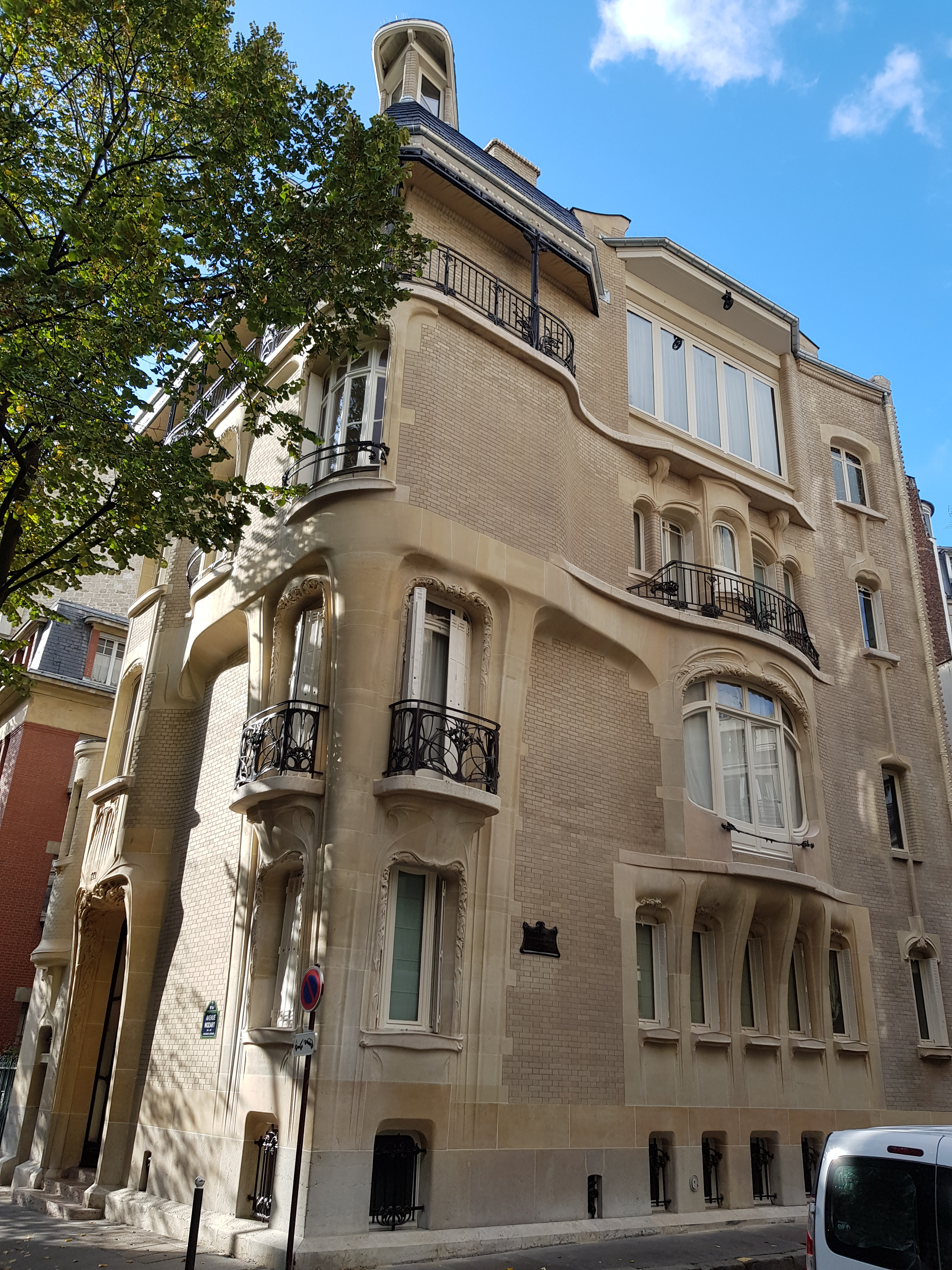
Art Nouveau – Hôtel Guimard (Avenue Mozart no. 122), Paris, by Hector Guimard (1909)

Art Deco was not a single style, but a collection of different and sometimes contradictory styles. In architecture, Art Deco was the successor to (and reaction against) Art Nouveau, a style which flourished in Europe between 1895 and 1900, and coexisted with the Beaux-Arts and neoclassical that were predominant in European and American architecture. In 1905 Eugène Grasset wrote and published Méthode de Composition Ornementale, Éléments Rectilignes, in which he systematically explored the decorative (ornamental) aspects of geometric elements, forms, motifs and their variations, in contrast with (and as a departure from) the undulating Art Nouveau style of Hector Guimard, so popular in Paris a few years earlier. Grasset stressed the principle that various simple geometric shapes like triangles and squares are the basis of all compositional arrangements. The reinforced-concrete buildings of Auguste Perret and Henri Sauvage, and particularly the Théâtre des Champs-Élysées, offered a new form of construction and decoration which was copied worldwide.

=== Ancient and non-European civilizations ===
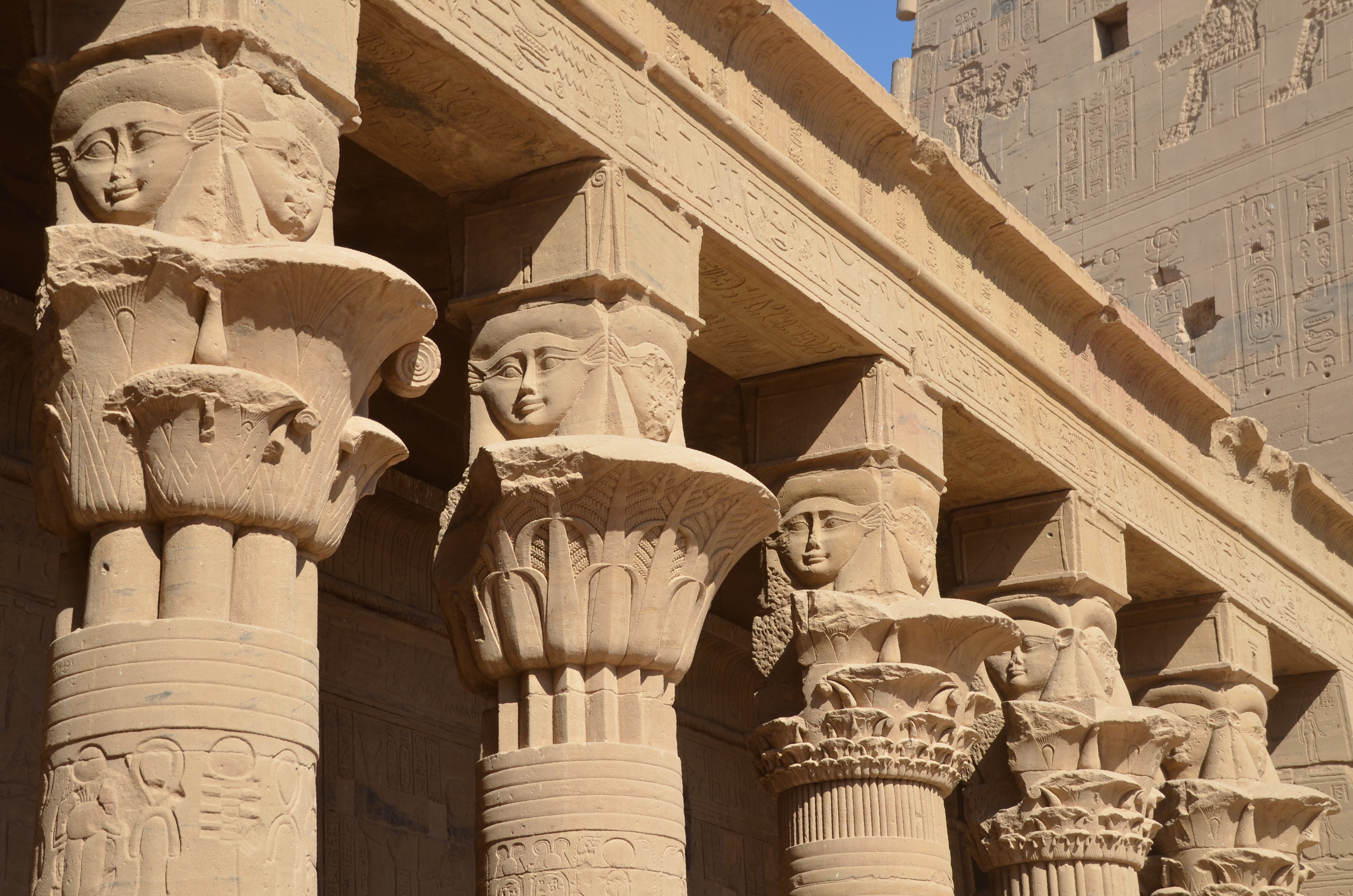
Ancient Egyptian art – Vegetal capitals in the courtyard of the Isis Temple, Philae, Egypt, unknown architect (380 BC–117 AD)

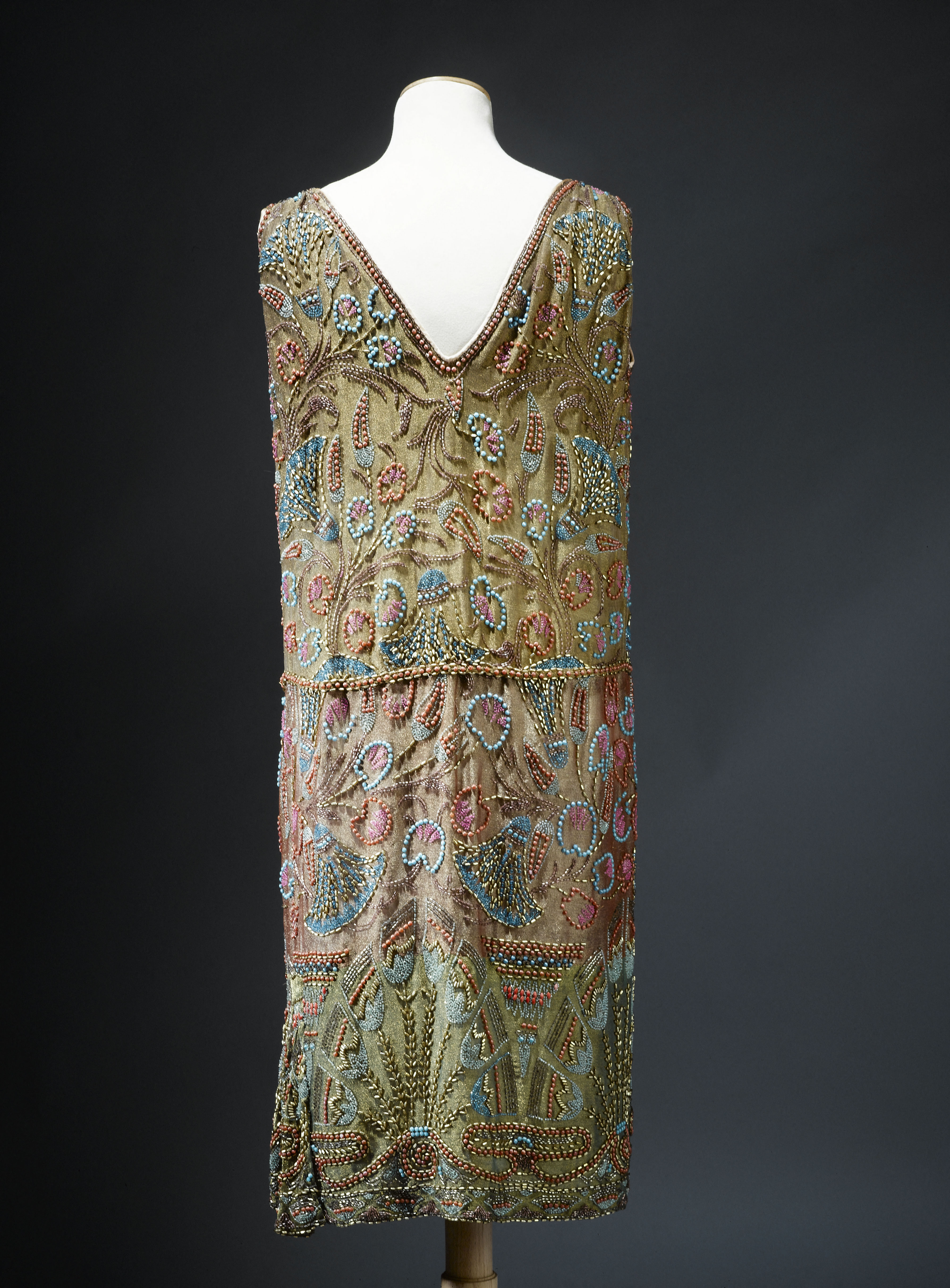
Egyptian influences – Dress with lotus flowers inspired by Ancient Egyptian decoration, by Jenny (couturier) and Lesage (embroiderer) (1925), silk, metallic thread, and crocheted embroidery, Musée Galliera, Paris

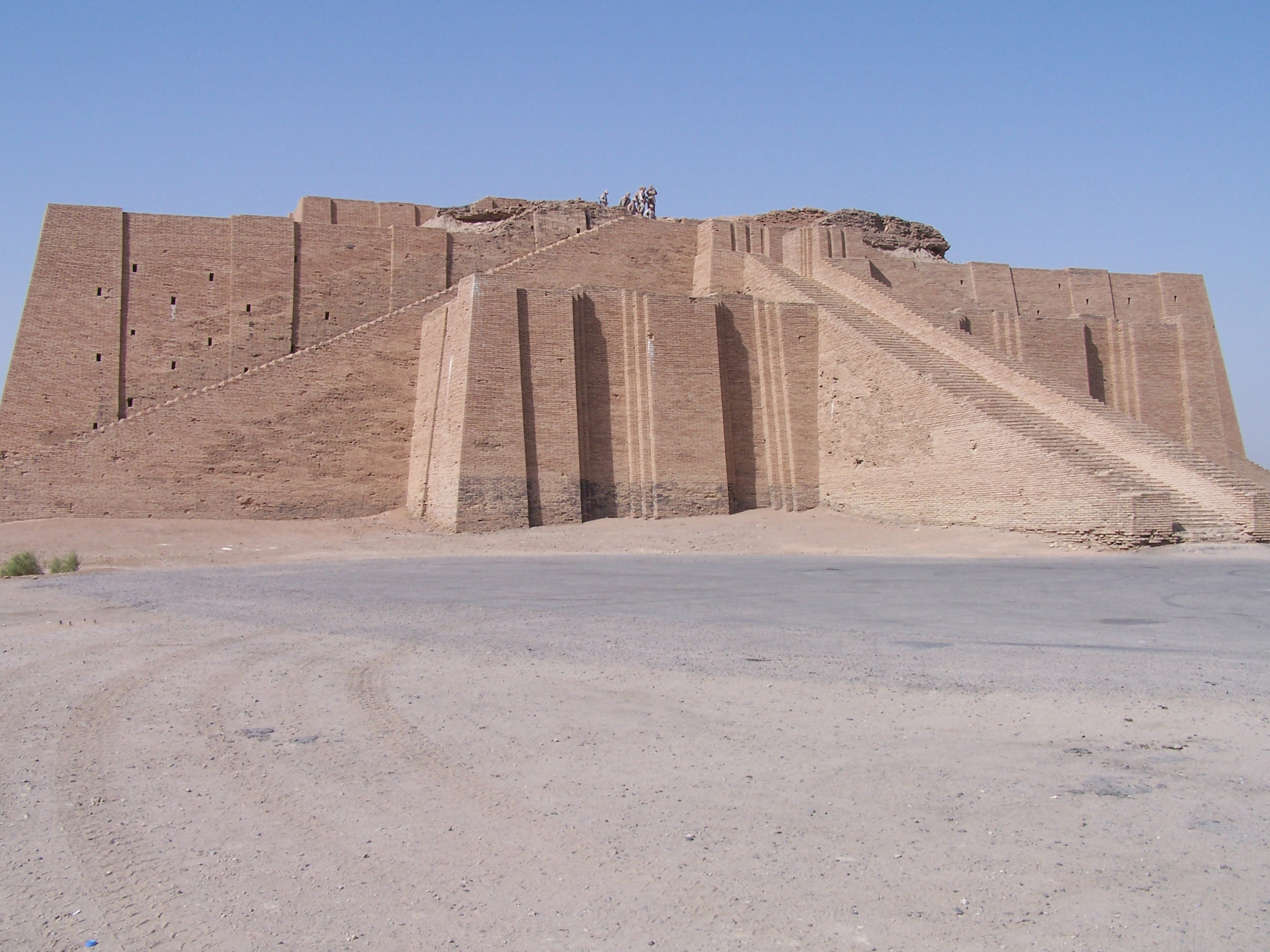
Mesopotamian art – Ziggurat of Ur in Tell el-Muqayyar, Dhi Qar Province, Iraq, unknown architect (21st century BC)

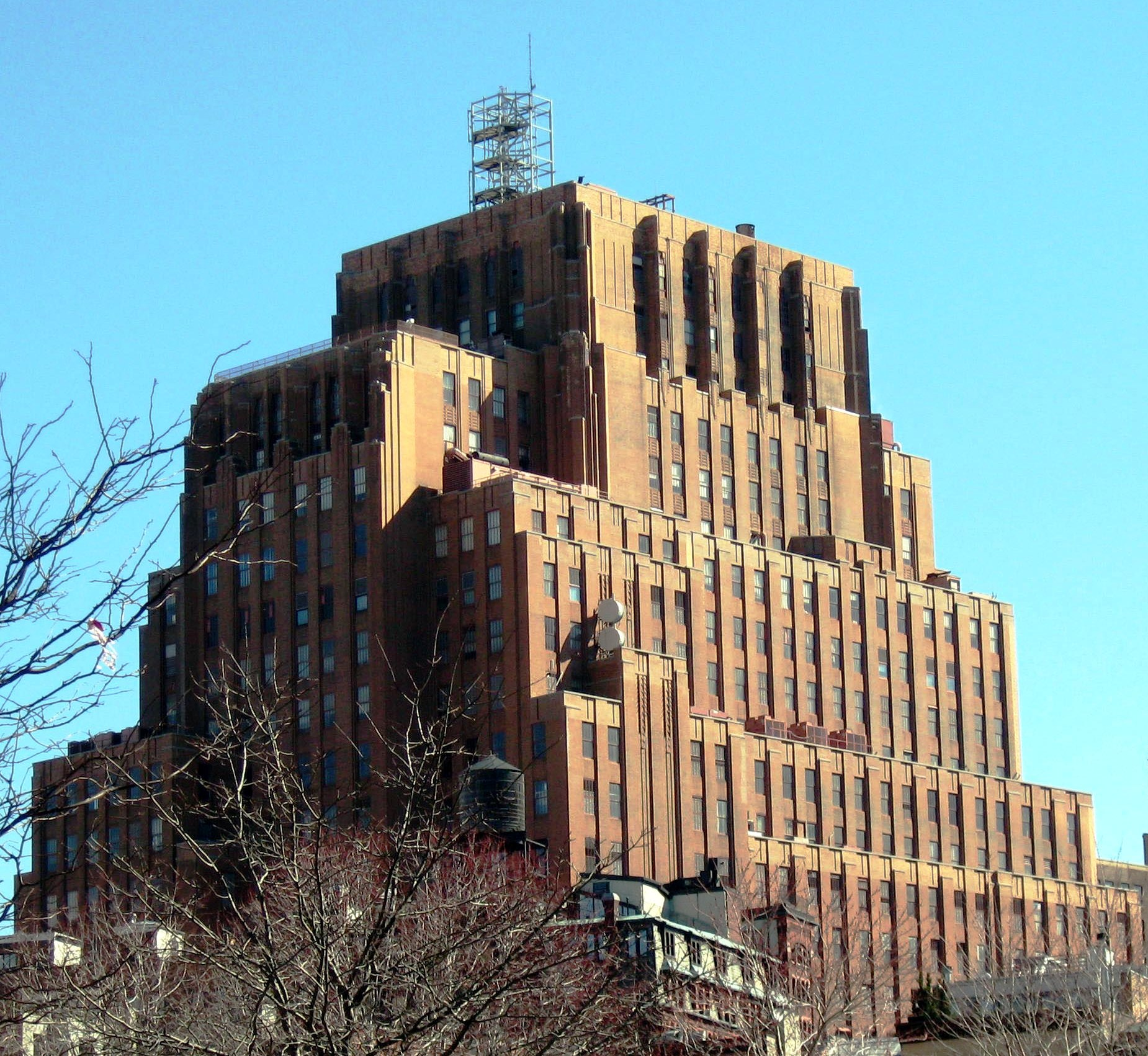
Mesopotamian influences – Western Union Building (Hudson Street no. 60) in New York City, by Voorhees, Gmelin and Walker (1928–1930)

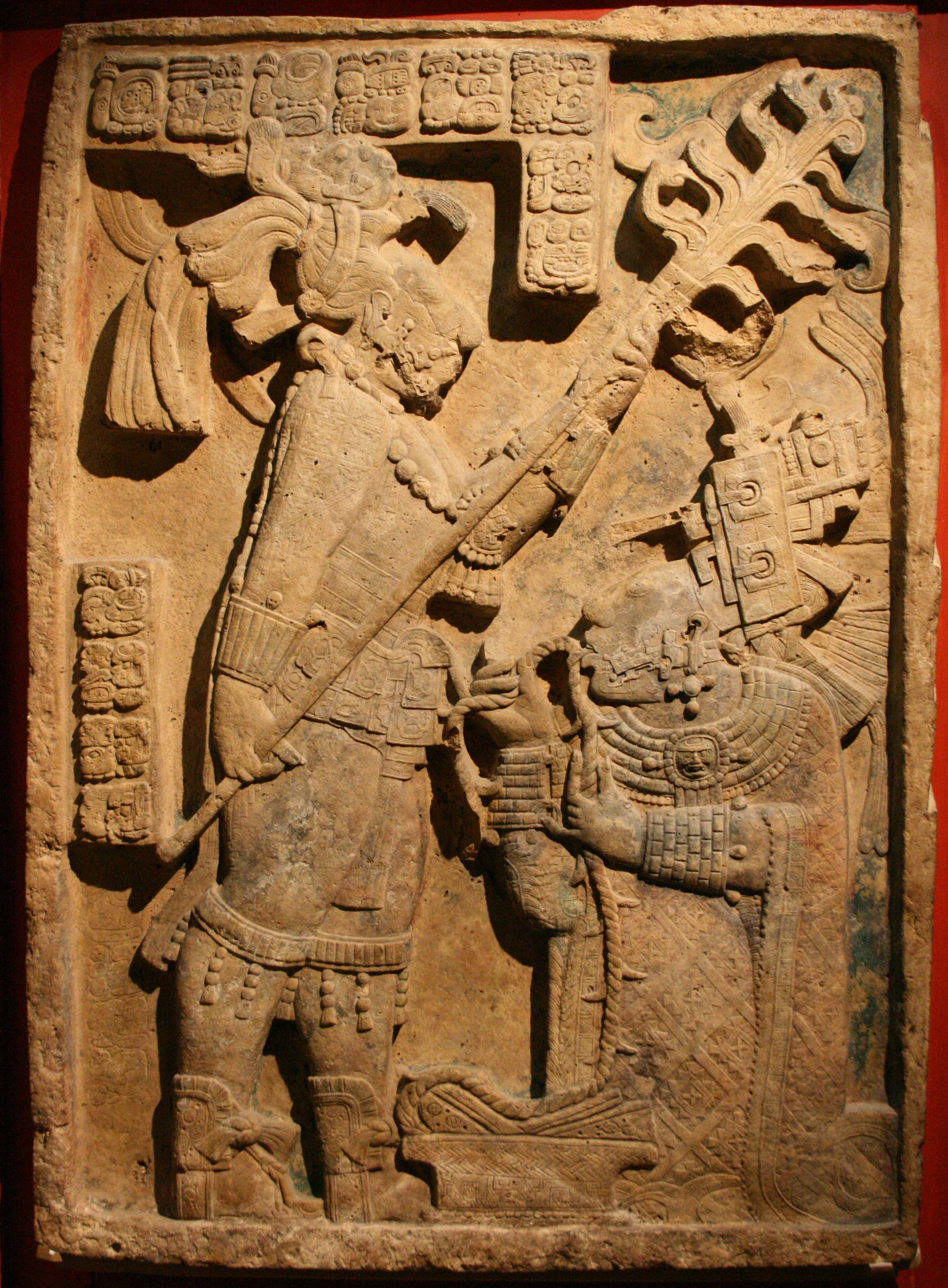
Pre-Columbian art (in this case Maya) – Yaxchilan Lintel 24 (702 AD), limestone, British Museum, London

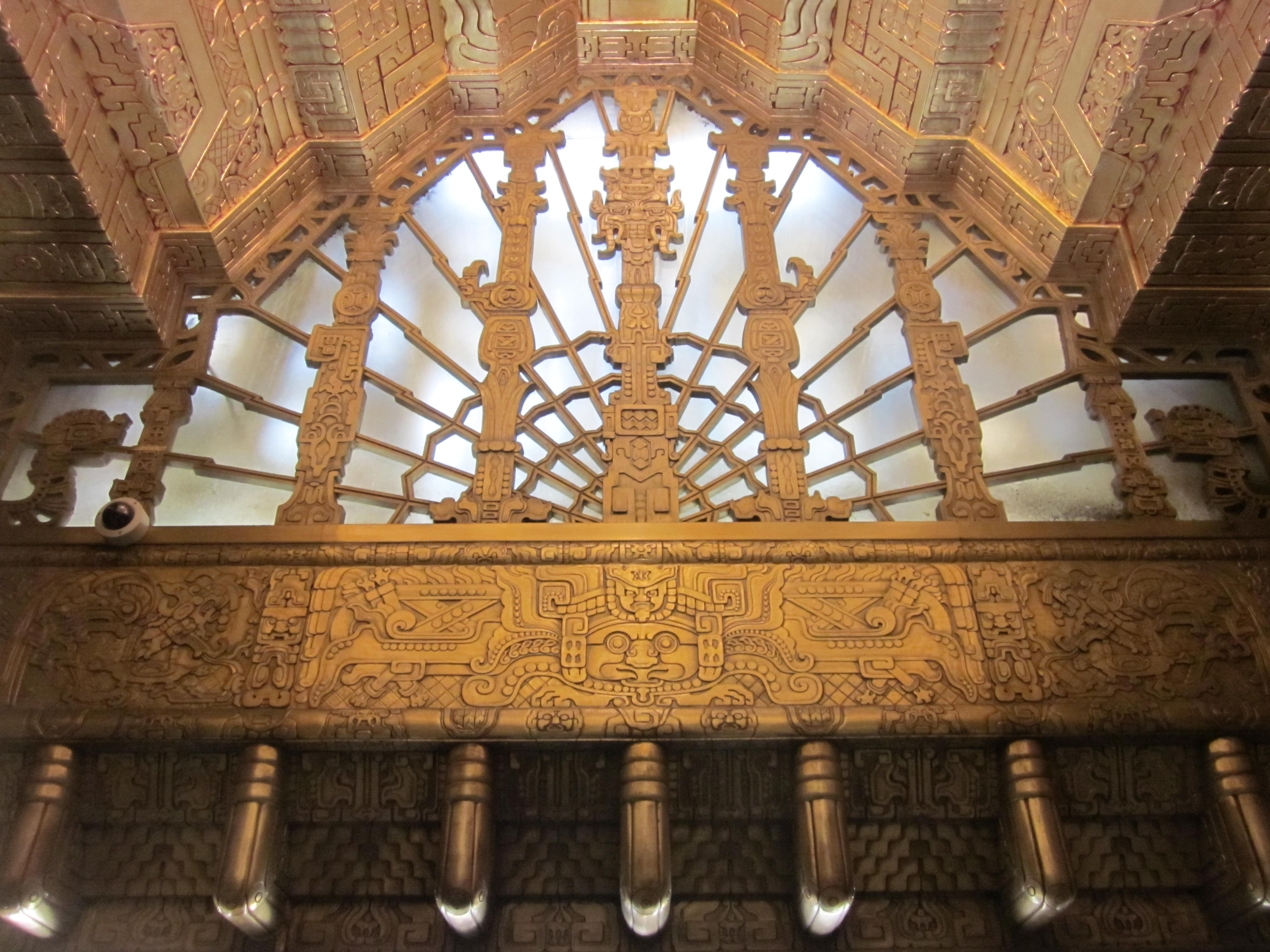
Pre-Columbian influences (in this case Maya) – Interior detail of 450 Sutter Street in San Francisco, California, by Timothy L. Pflueger (1929)

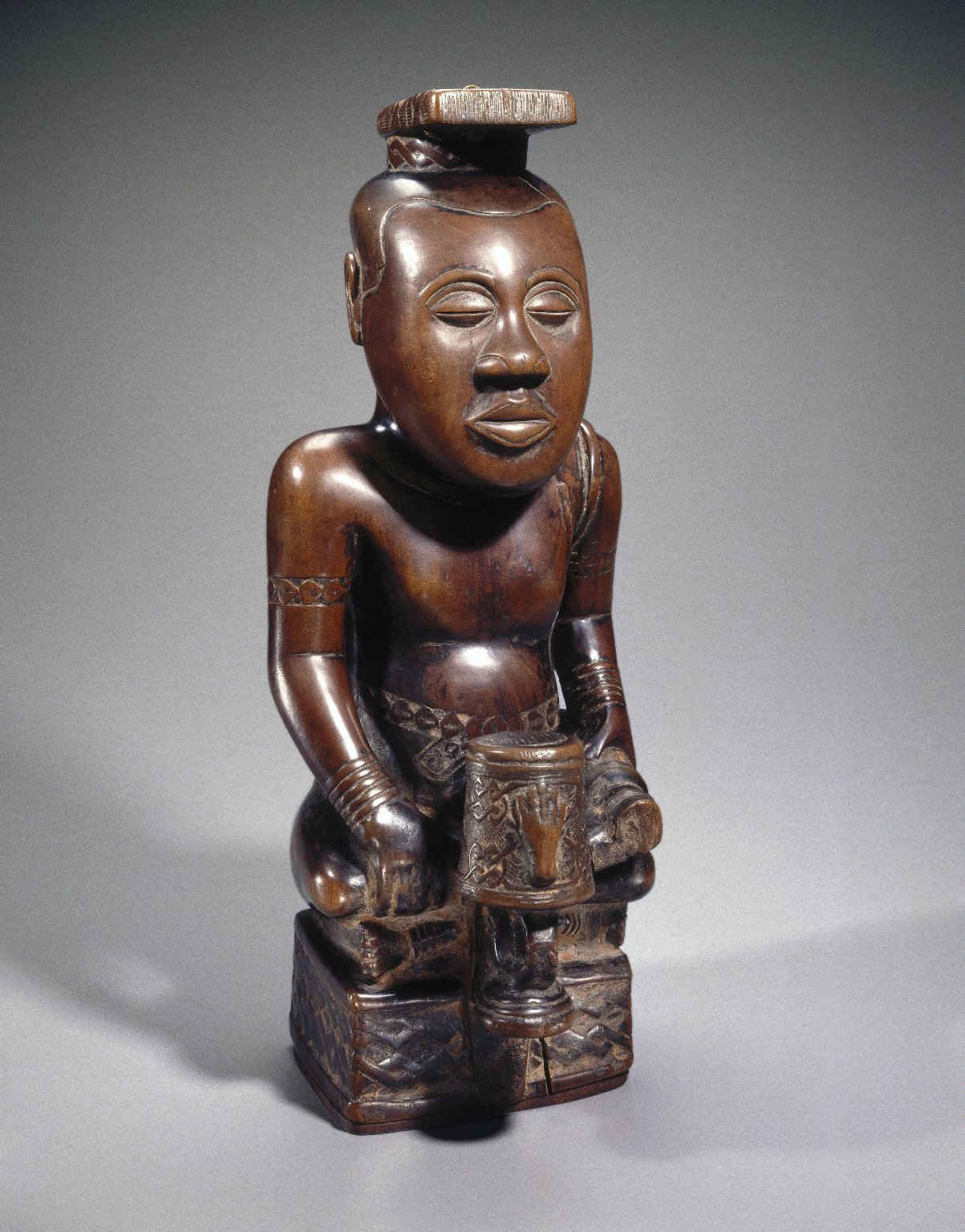
Sub-Saharian African (in this case produced in the Kuba Kingdom from present-day Democratic Republic of the Congo) – Ndop of King Mishe miShyaang maMbul (1760–1780), wood, Brooklyn Museum, New York City

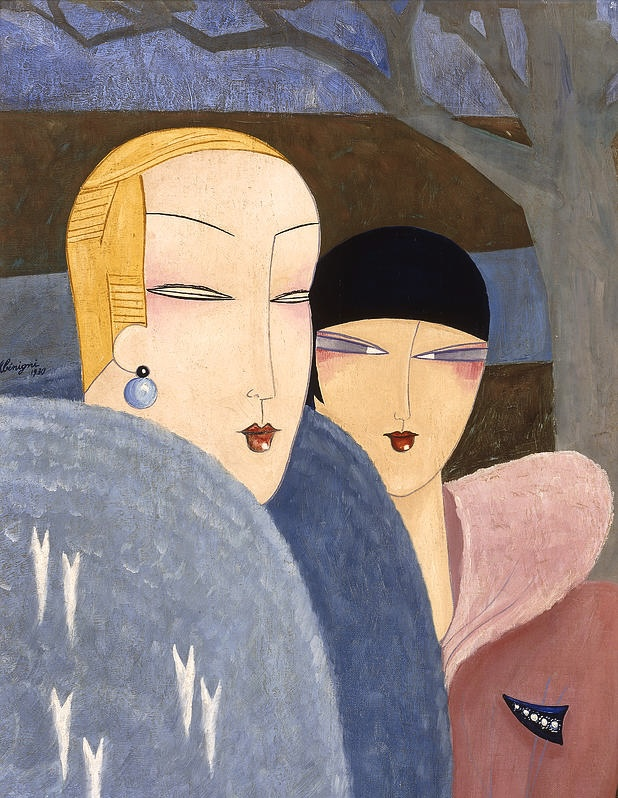
Sub-Saharian African influences – Winter 1930, by Léon Benigni, oil on canvas, private collection

In decoration, many different styles were borrowed and used by Art Deco. They included pre-modern art from around the world and observable at the Musée du Louvre, Musée de l'Homme and the Musée national des Arts d'Afrique et d'Océanie. There was also popular interest in archaeology due to excavations at Pompeii, Troy, and the tomb of the 18th dynasty Pharaoh Tutankhamun. Artists and designers integrated motifs from ancient Egypt, Africa, Mesopotamia, Greece, Rome, Asia, Mesoamerica and Oceania with Machine Age elements.

=== Early 20th-century avant-garde movements ===
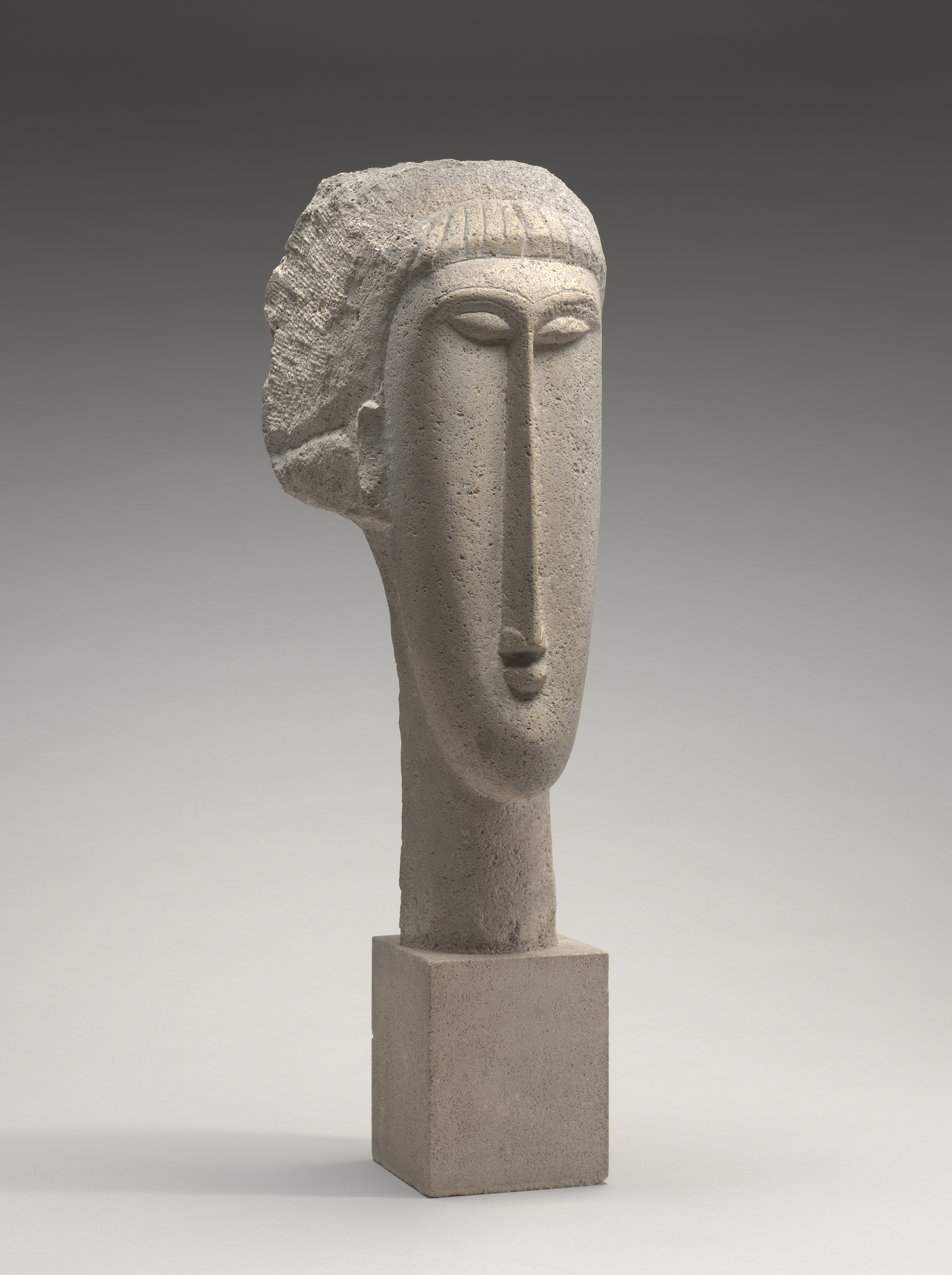
Primitivism – Head of a Woman, by Amedeo Modigliani (1910–11), limestone, National Gallery of Art, Washington, D.C.

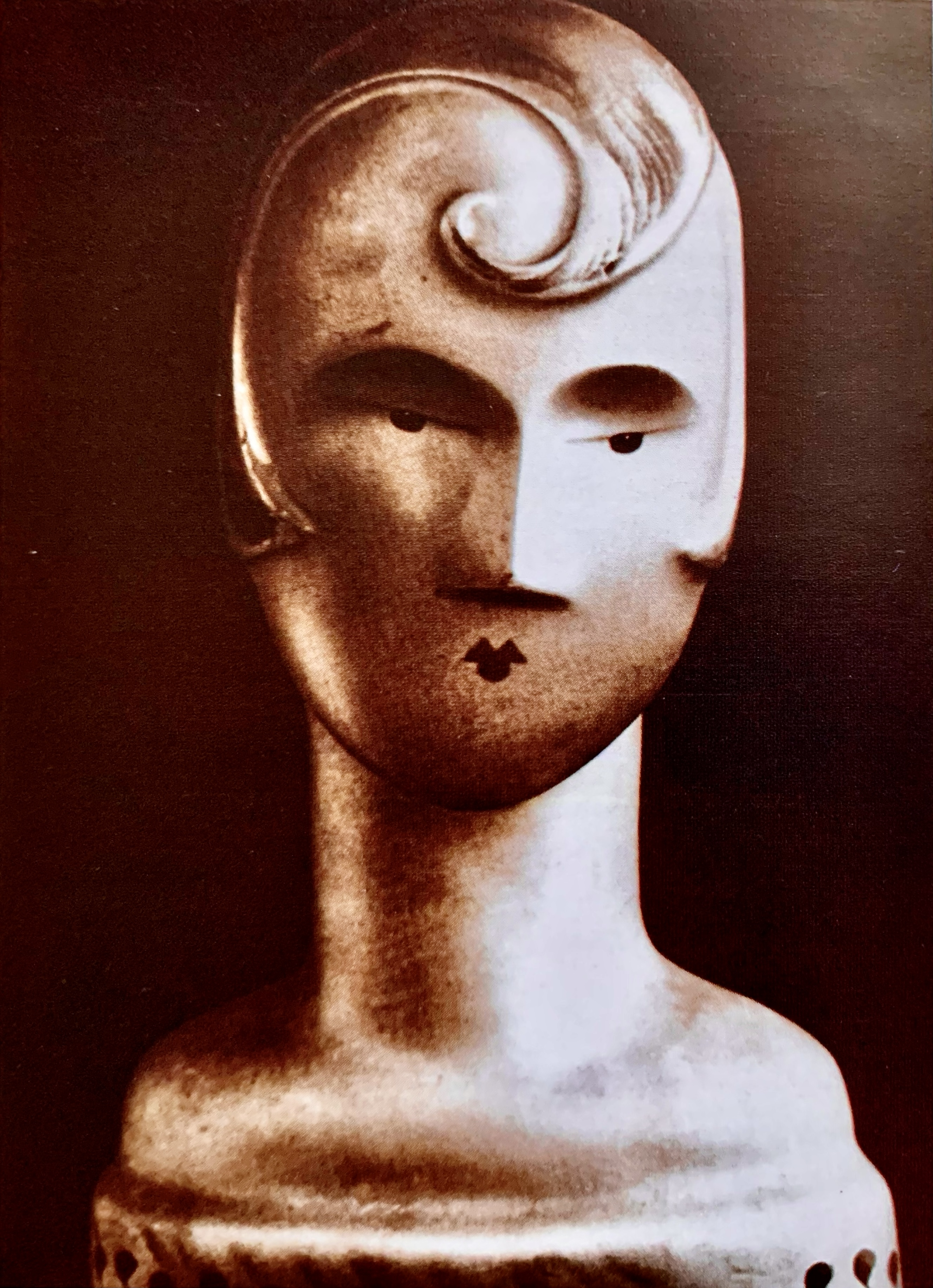
Primitivist influences – Bust for a shop window, anonymous Belgian artist (c. 1920), painted papier-mâché, private collection, Cologne, Germany

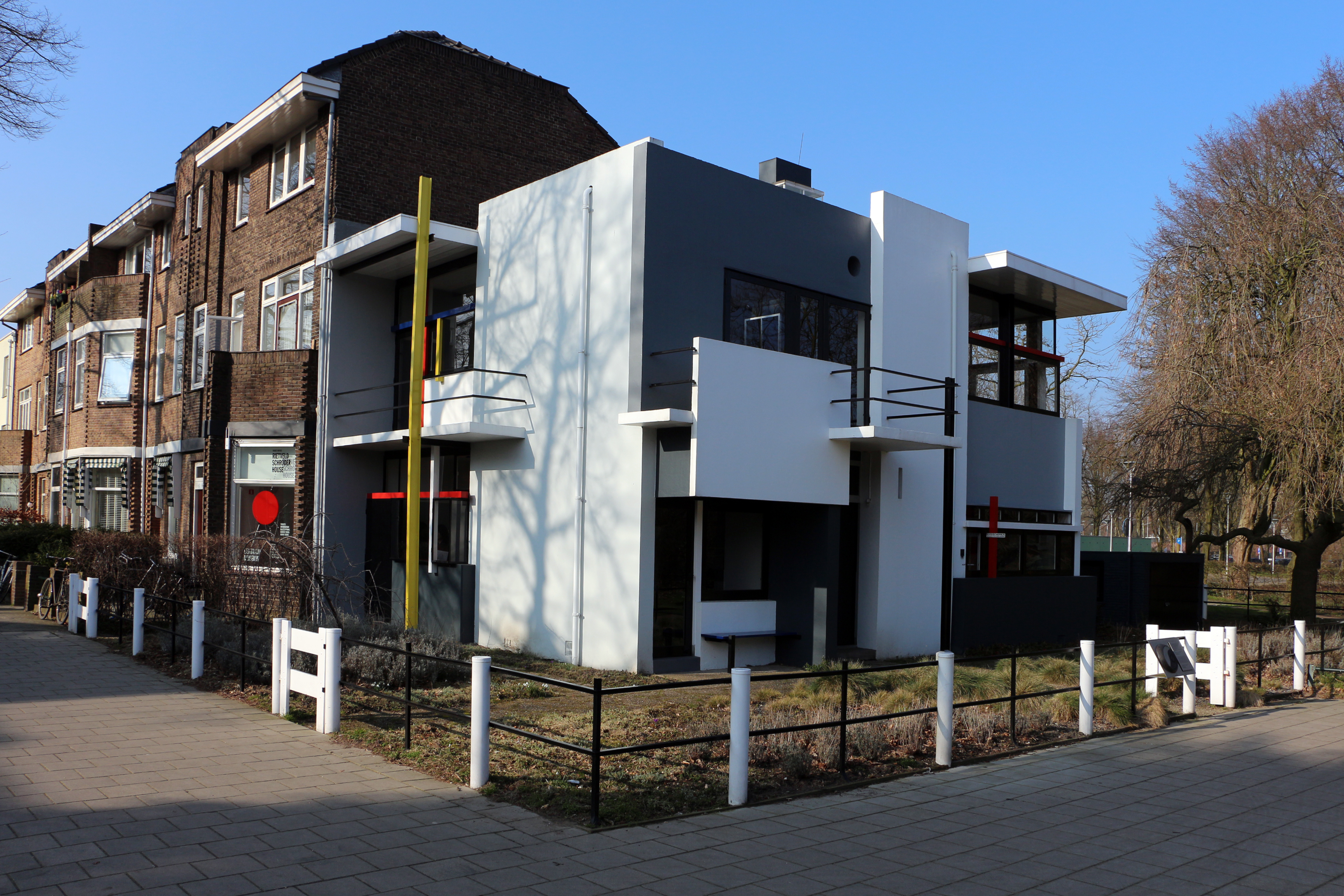
De Stijl – Rietveld Schröder House in Utrecht, Netherlands, by Gerrit Rietveld (1924)

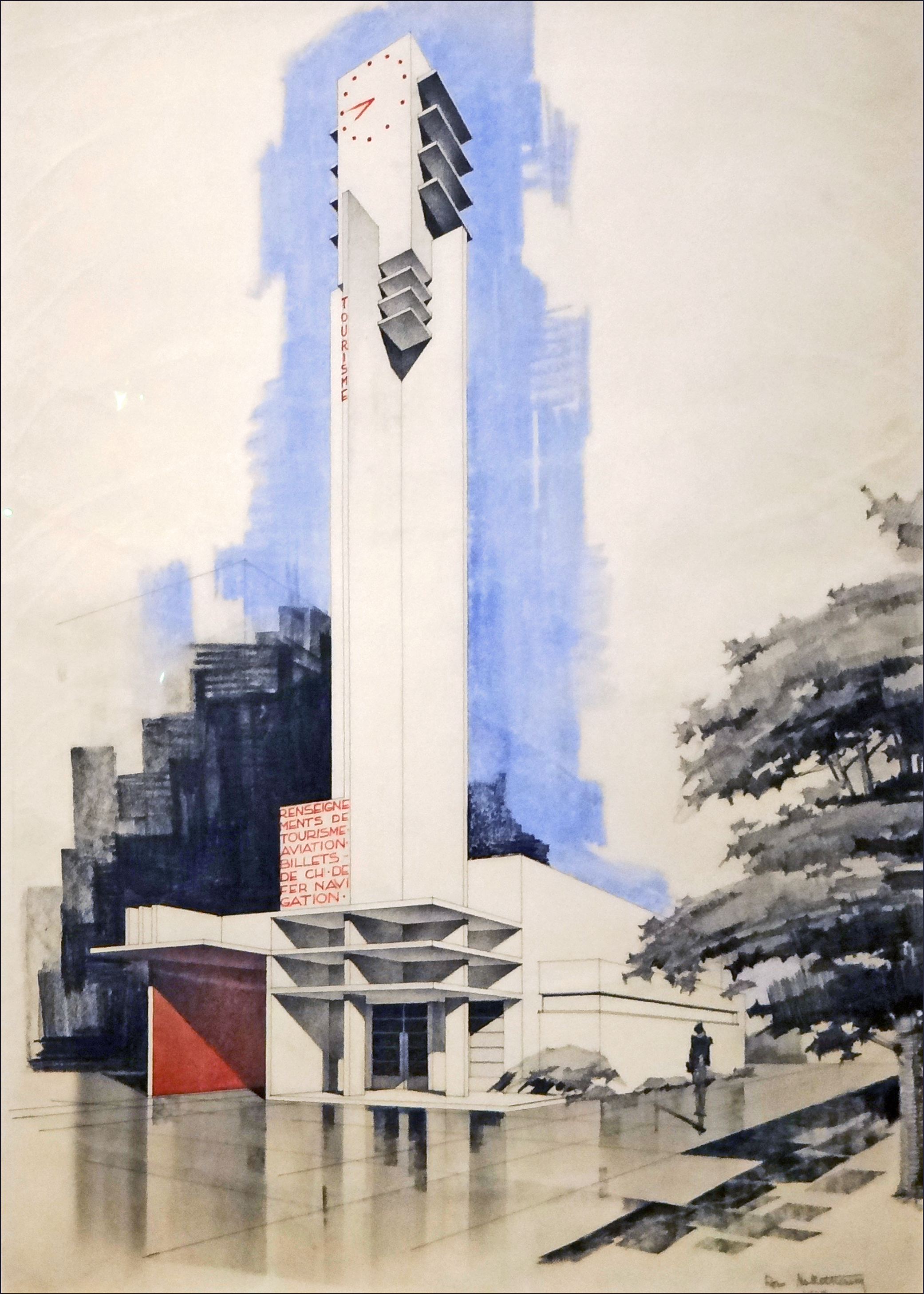
De Stijl influences – Pavillon du Tourisme, by Robert Mallet-Stevens, International Exhibition of Modern Decorative and Industrial Arts, Paris (1925)

Cubism – Figure dans un Fauteuil (Seated Nude, Femme nue assise), by Pablo Picasso (1909–10), oil on canvas, Tate Modern, London

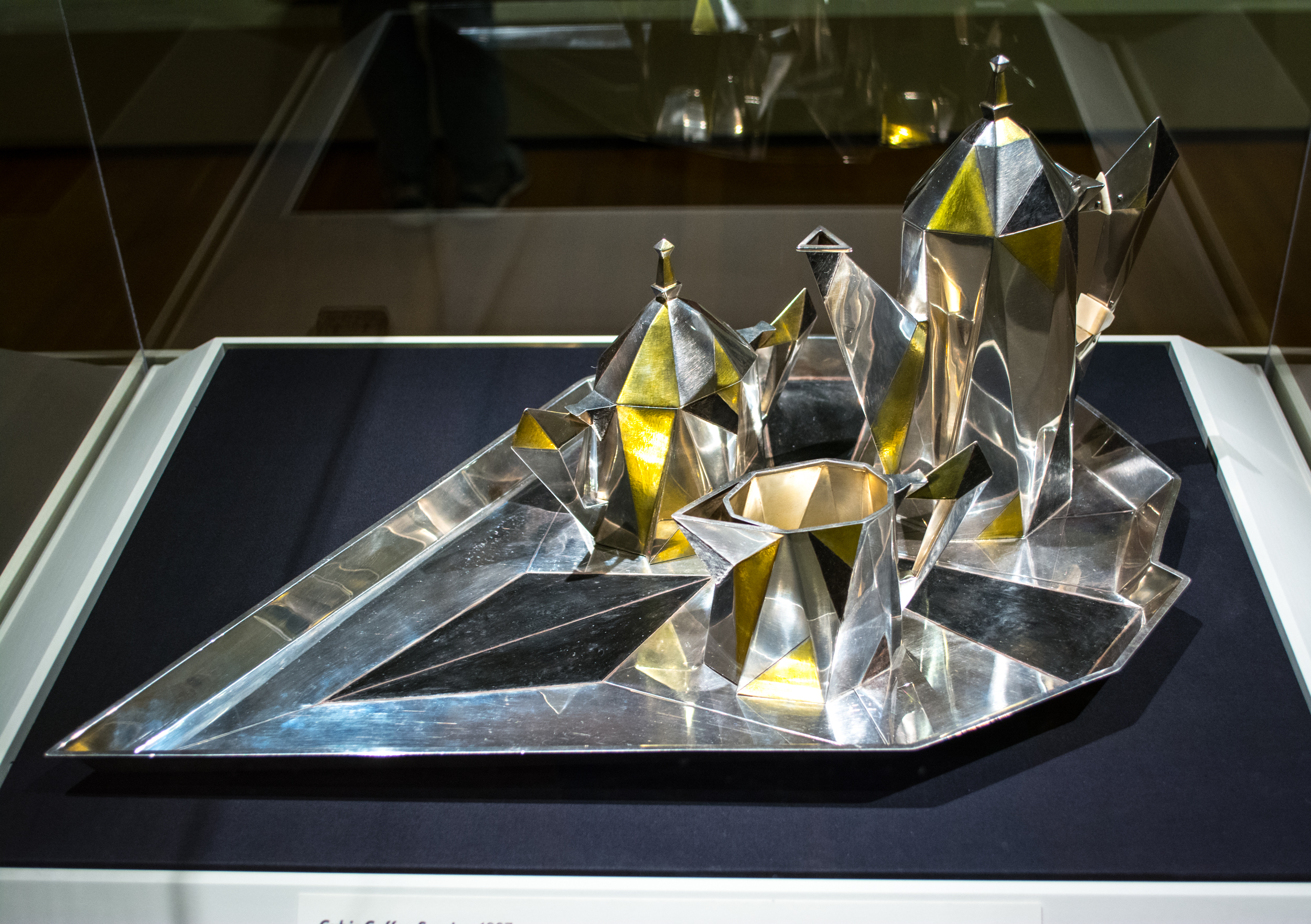
Cubist influences – Cubic coffee service, by Erik Magnussen (1927), silver, in a temporary exhibition called the "Jazz Age" at the Cleveland Museum of Art, US

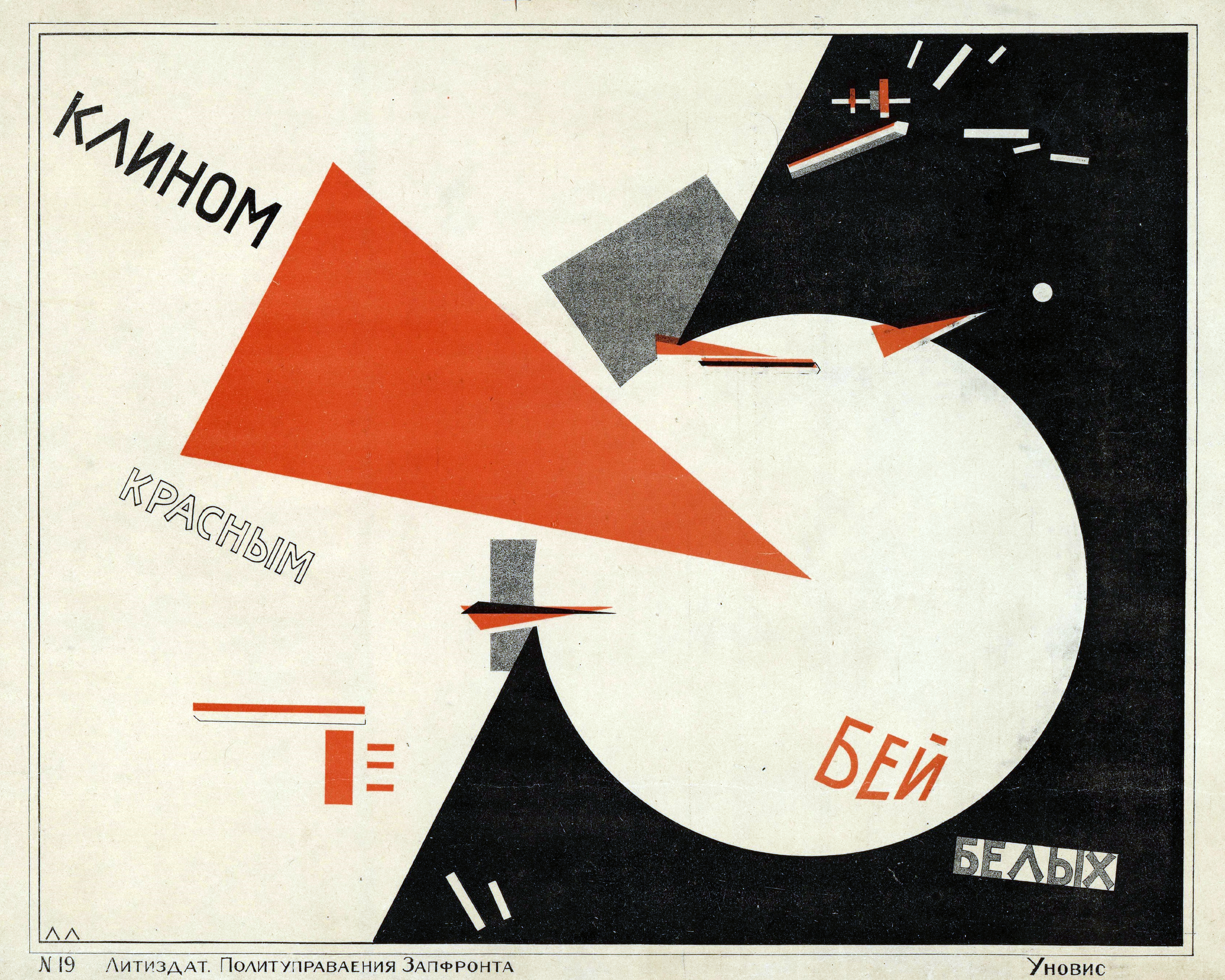
Constructivism – Beat the Whites with the Red Wedge, by El Lissitzky (1919–1920), lithographic poster, Russian State Library, Moscow

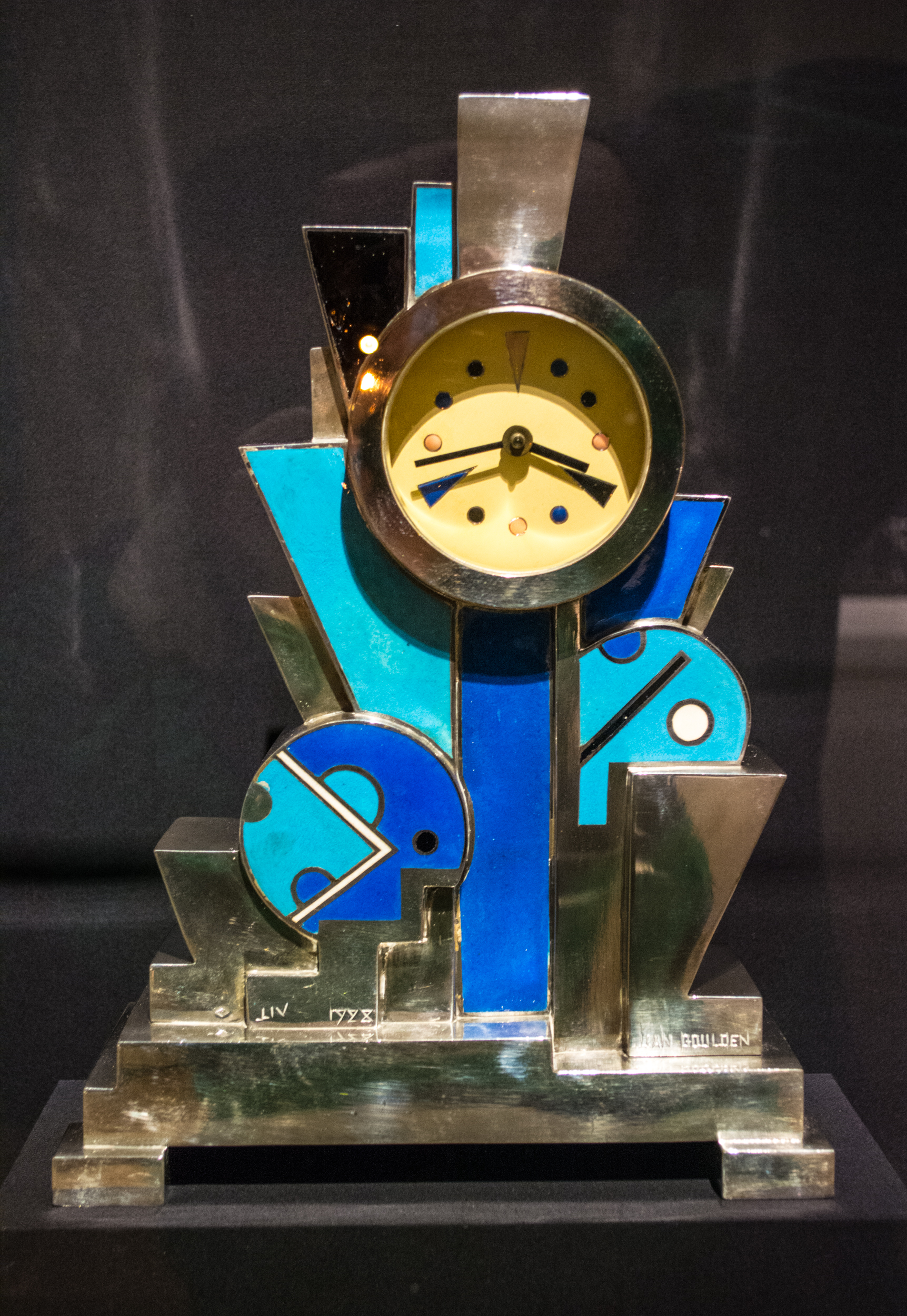
Constructivist influences – Clock, decorated with flat geometric shapes, by Jean Goulden (1928), silvered bronze with enamel, Stephen E. Kelly Collection

Expressionist theatre and film – Scene from Metropolis, by Fritz Lang (1927)

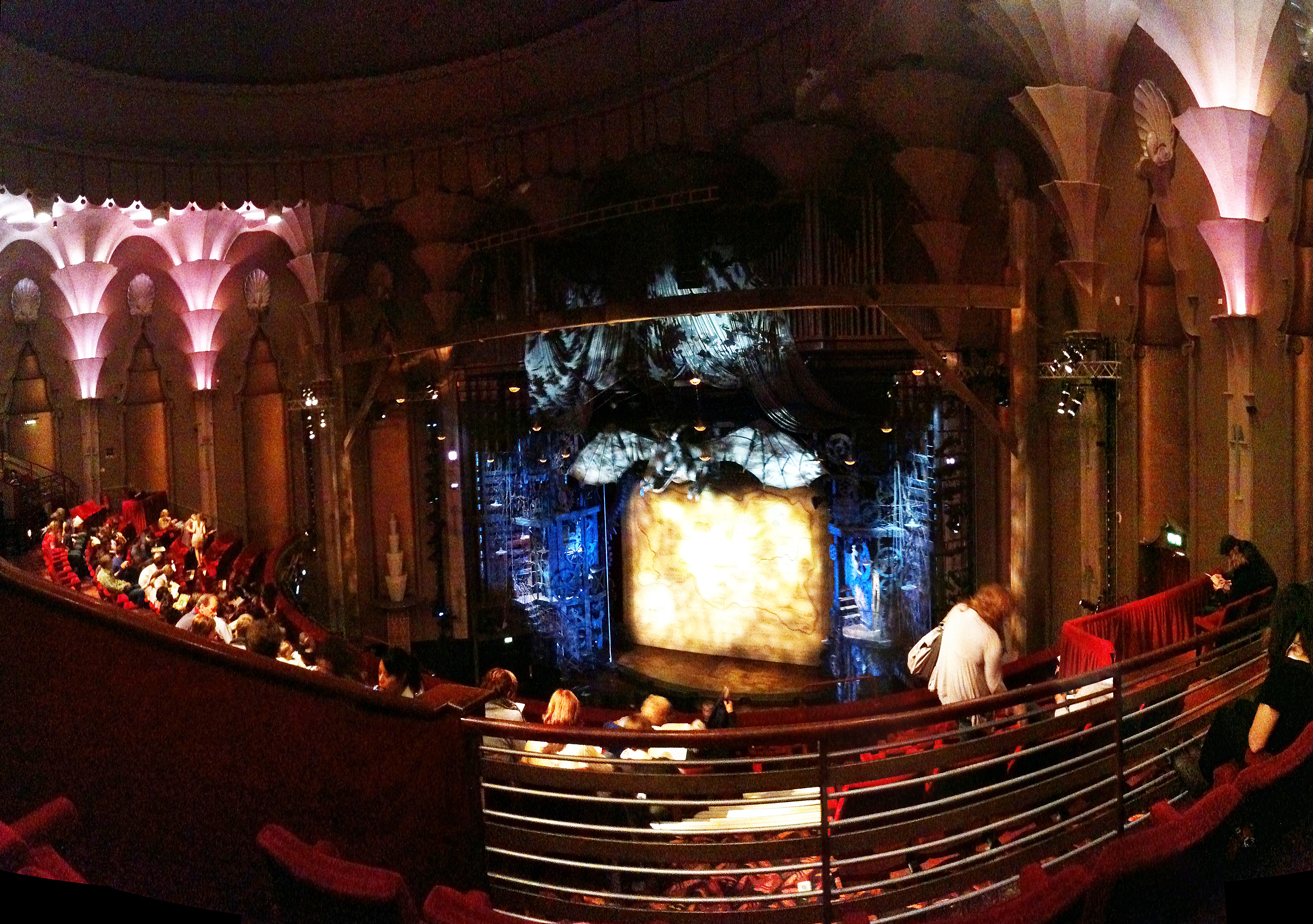
Influences of the Expressionist theatre and film – Interior of the Apollo Victoria Theatre in London, by Ernest Wamsley Lewis (1928–1930)

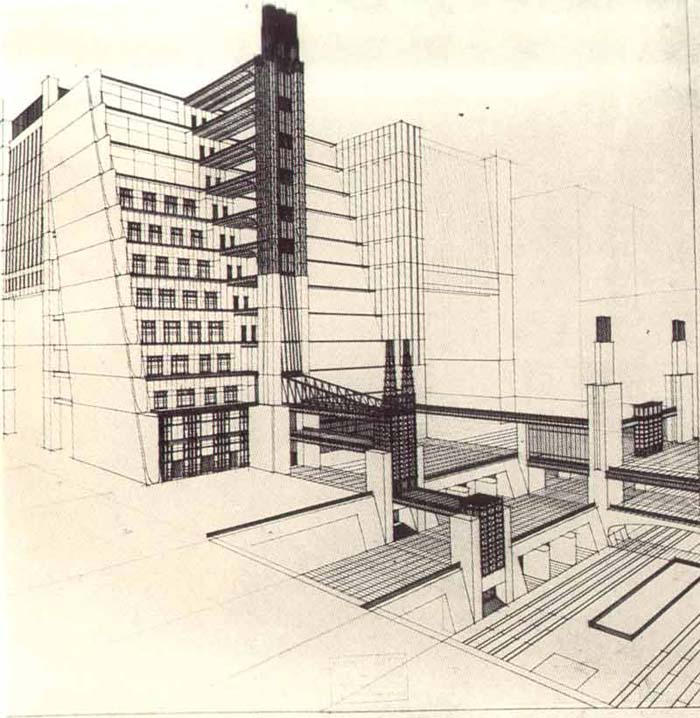
Futurism – Staircase house with elevators from four street levels, part of La Città Nuova, by Antonio Sant'Elia (1914), ink and pencil on paper, Musei Civici, Como, Italy

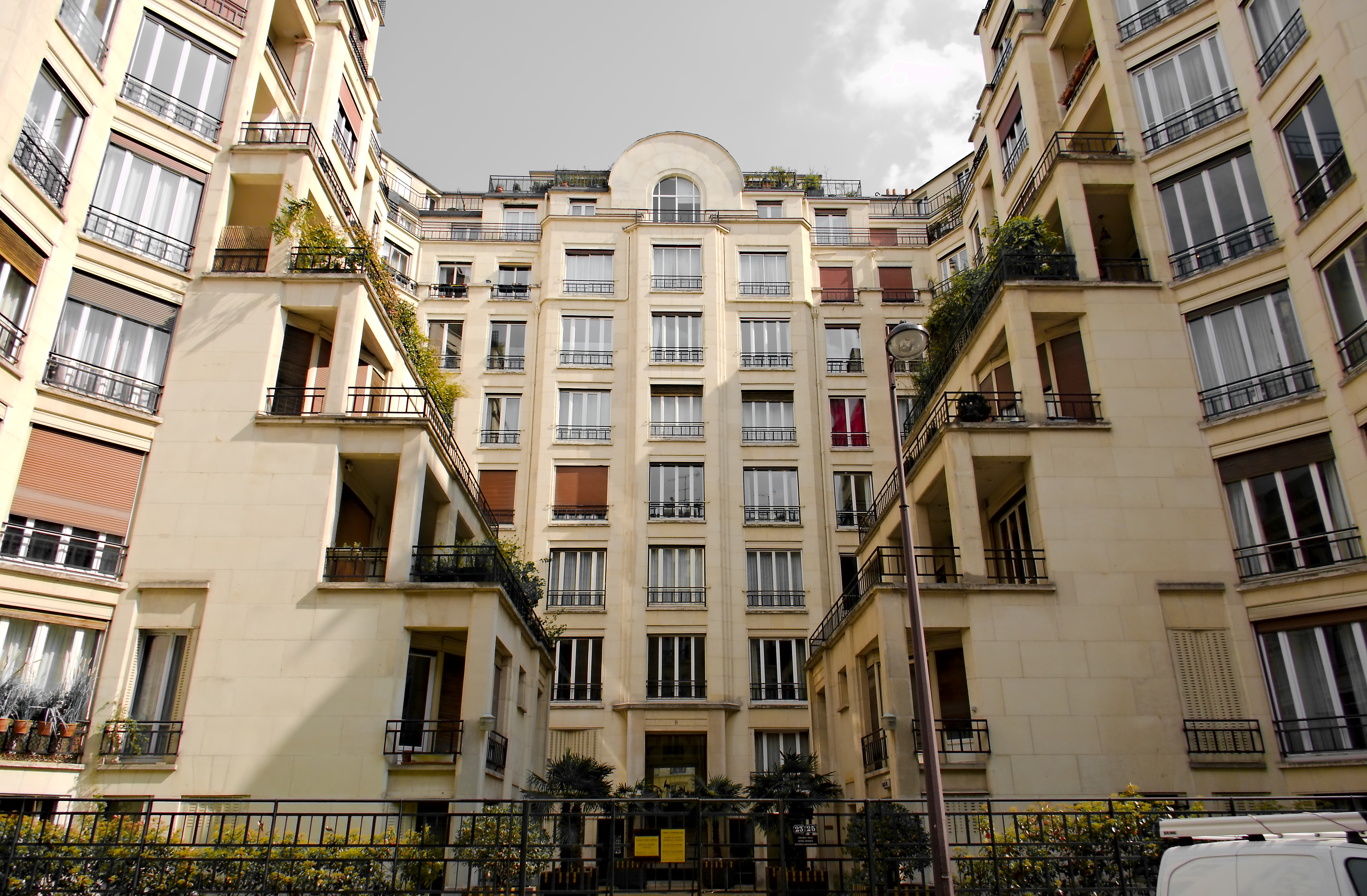
Futurist influences – Rue du Laos no. 25 in Paris, by Charles Thomas (1930)

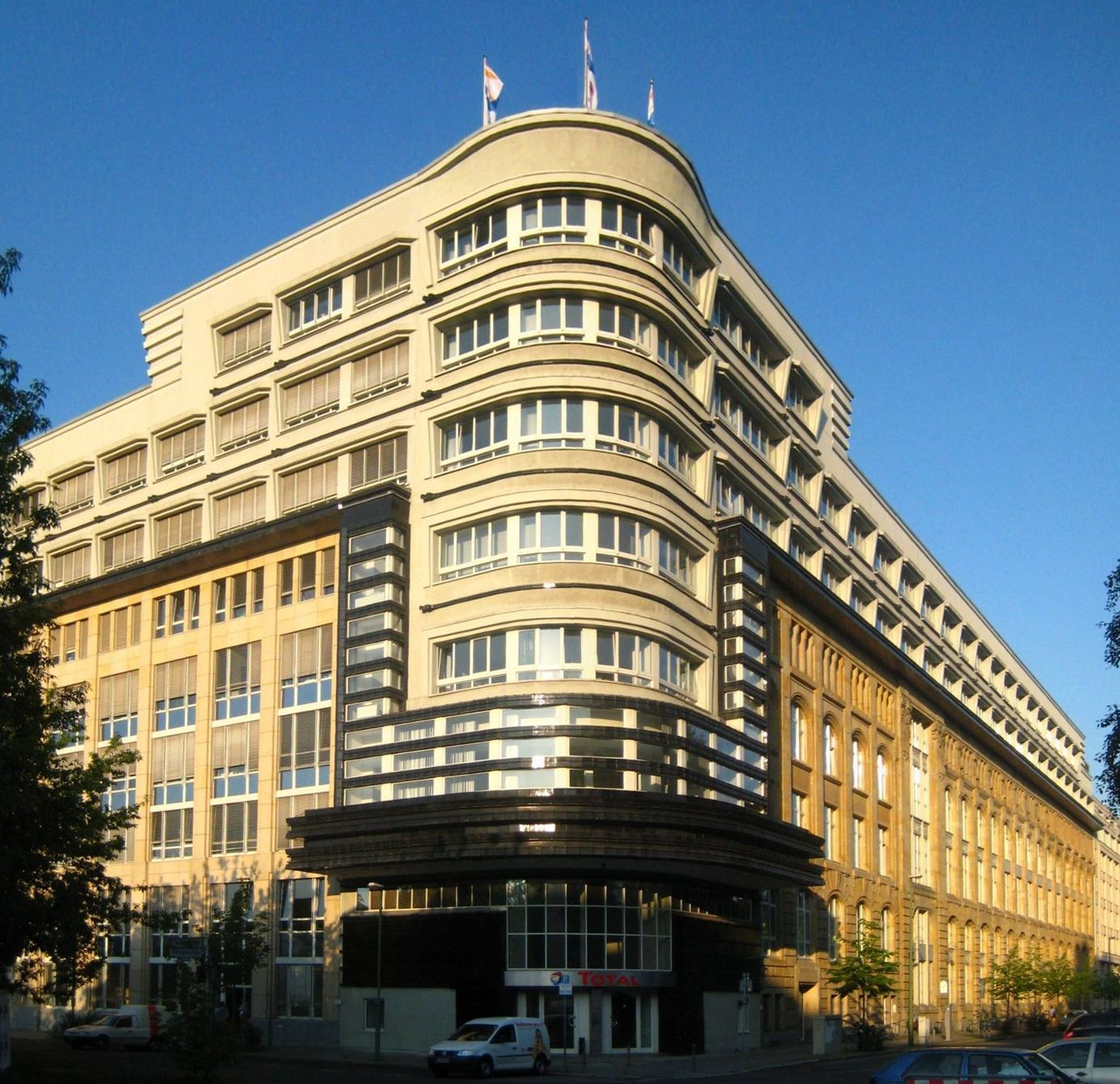
Expressionist architecture – Rudolf Mosse Printing and Publishing Company Building in Berlin, by Erich Mendelsohn (1921–1923)

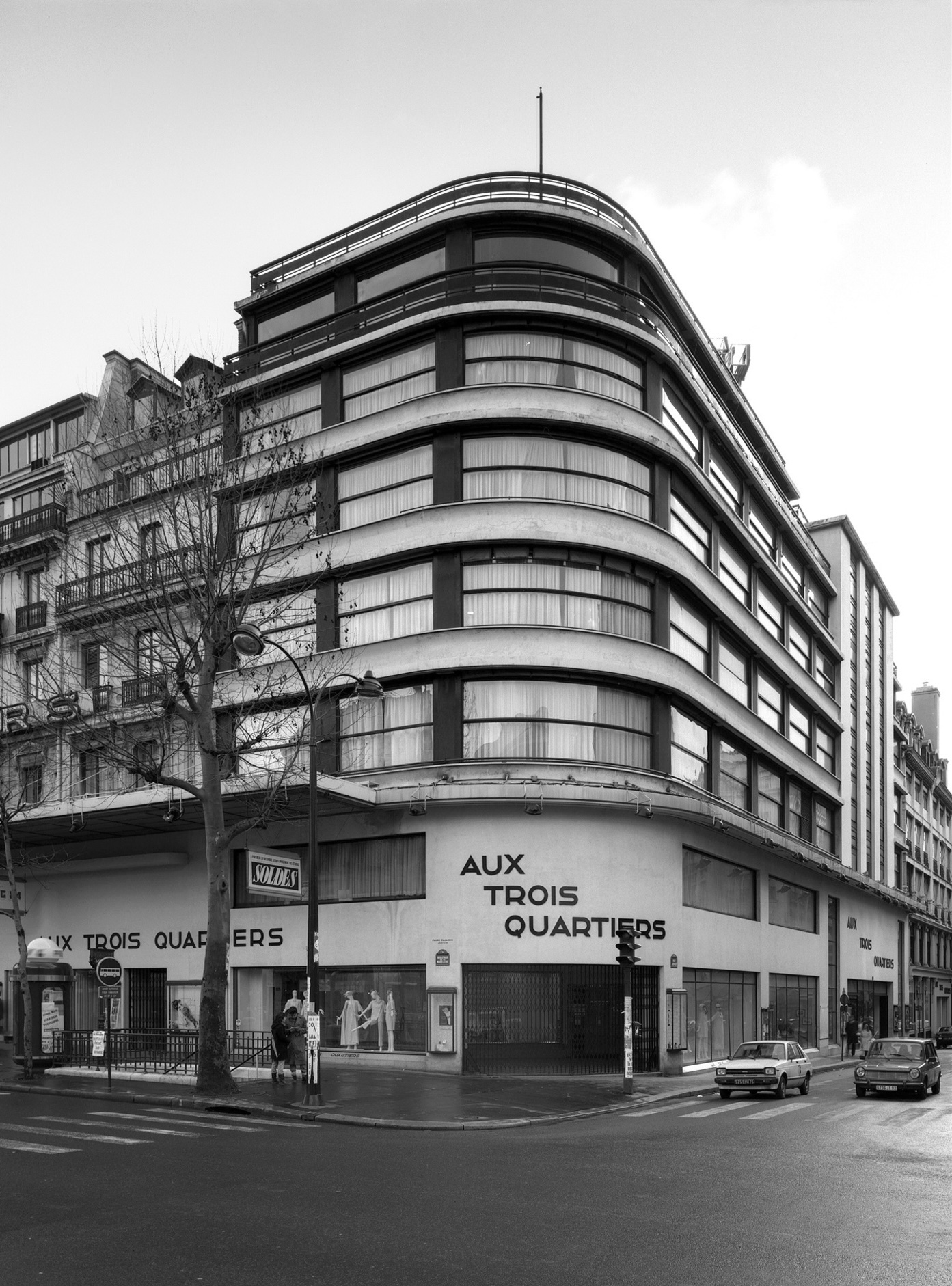
Expressionist architecture influences – Aux Trois-Quartiers department store in Paris, by Louis Faure-Dujarric (1932)

Other styles borrowed included Futurism, Orphism, Functionalism, and Modernism in general. Cubism discovers its decorative potential within the Art Deco aesthetic, when transposed from the canvas onto a textile material or wallpaper. Sonia Delaunay conceives her dress models in an abstract and geometric style, "as live paintings or sculptures of living forms". Cubist-like designs are created by Louis Barrilet in the stained-glass windows of the American bar at the Atrium Casino in Dax (1926), but also including names of fashionable cocktails. In architecture, the clear contrast between horizontal and vertical volumes, specific both to Russian Constructivism and the Frank Lloyd Wright-Willem Marinus Dudok line, becomes a common device in articulating Art Deco façades, from individual homes and tenement buildings to cinemas or oil stations. Art Deco also used the clashing colours and designs of Fauvism, notably in the work of Henri Matisse and André Derain, inspired the designs of Art Deco textiles, wallpaper, and painted ceramics. It took ideas from the high fashion vocabulary of the period, which featured geometric designs, chevrons, zigzags, and stylized bouquets of flowers. It was influenced by discoveries in Egyptology, and growing interest in the Orient and in African art. From 1925 onwards, it was often inspired by a passion for new machines, such as airships, automobiles and ocean liners, and by 1930 this influence resulted in the style called Streamline Moderne.

== International Exhibition of Modern Decorative and Industrial Arts (1925) ==
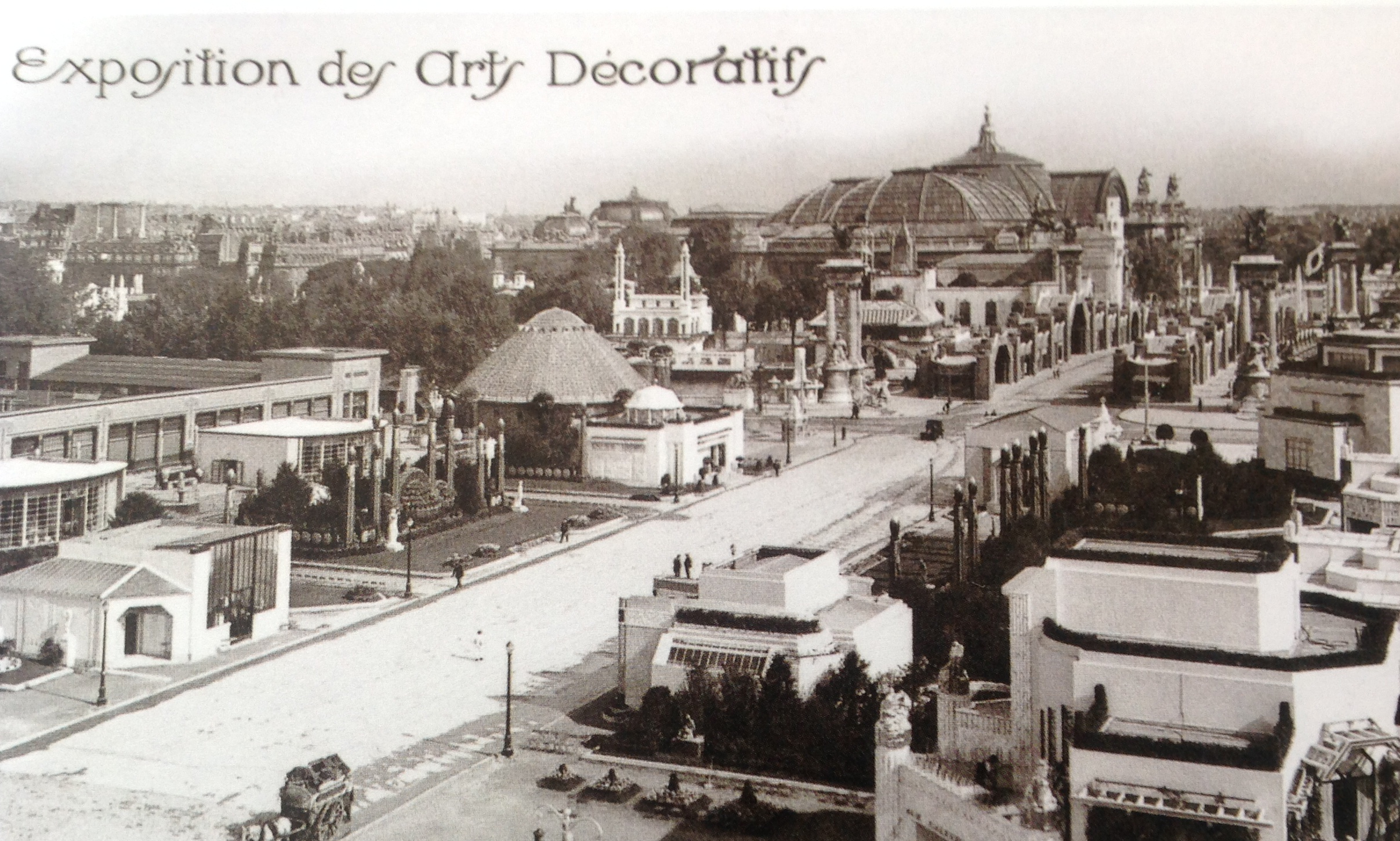
Postcard of the International Exhibition of Modern Decorative and Industrial Arts in Paris (1925)

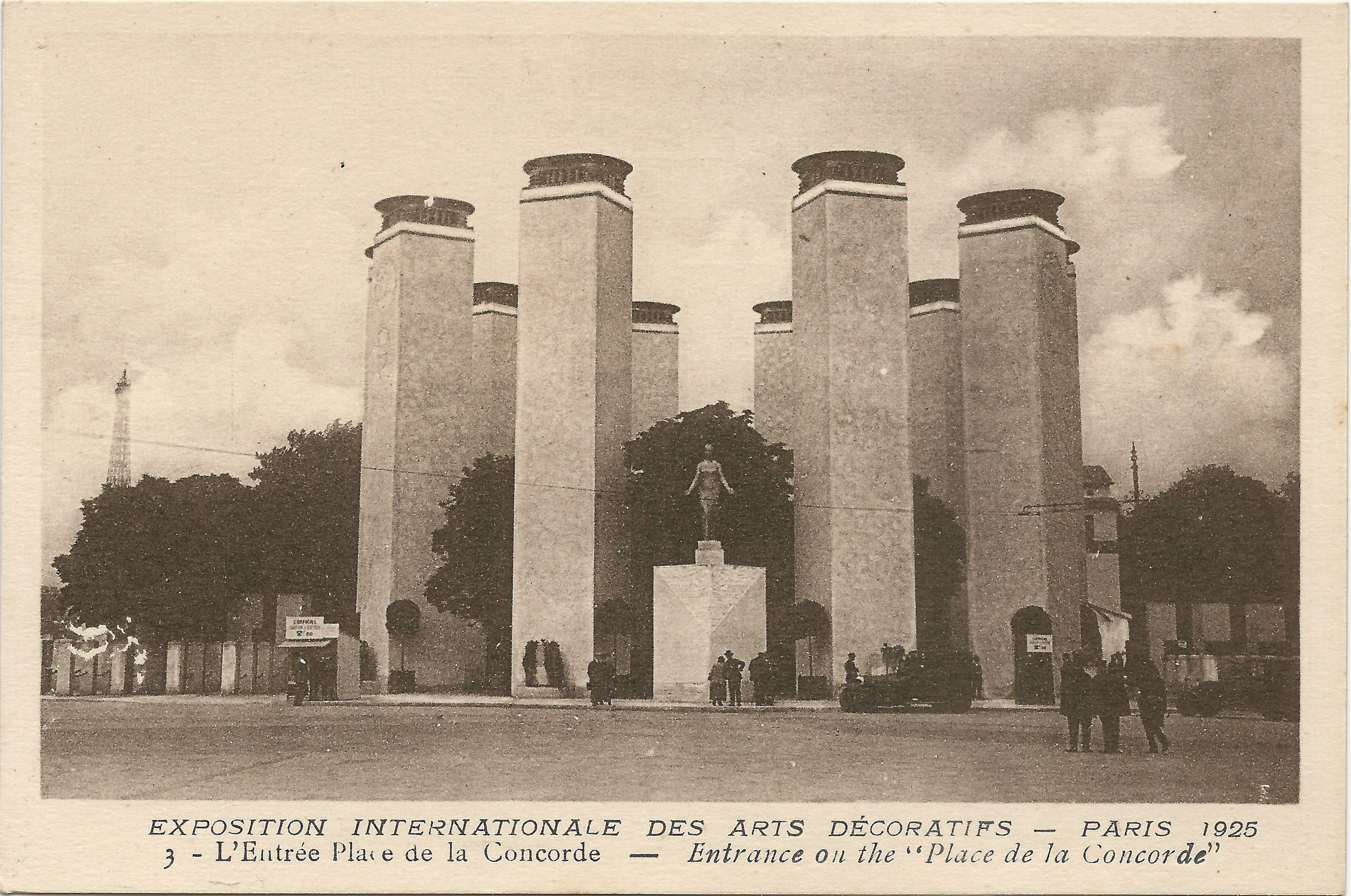
Entrance to the 1925 Exposition from Place de la Concorde by Pierre Patout

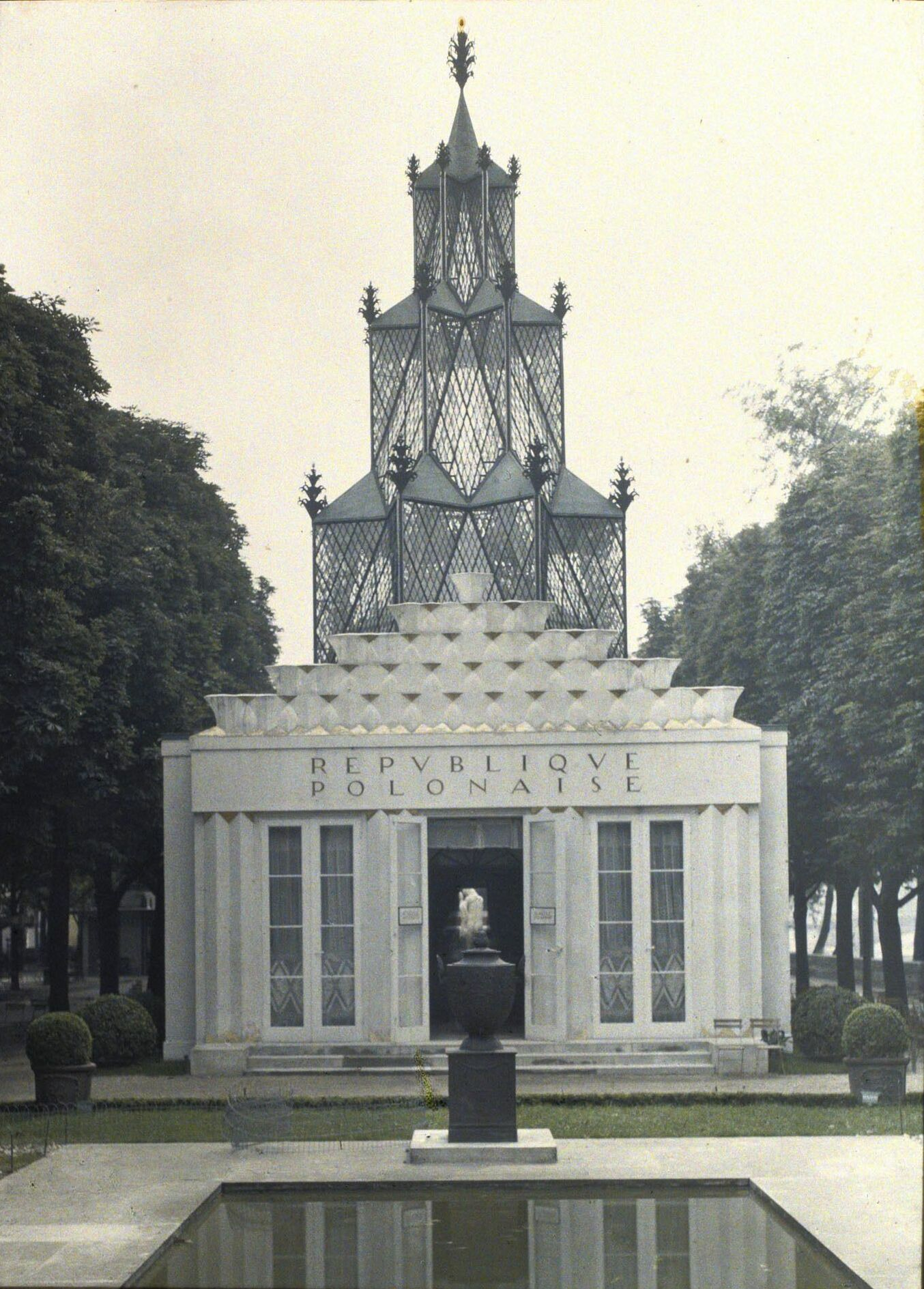
The Polish pavilion, designed by Józef Czajkowski and Wojciech Jastrzębowski

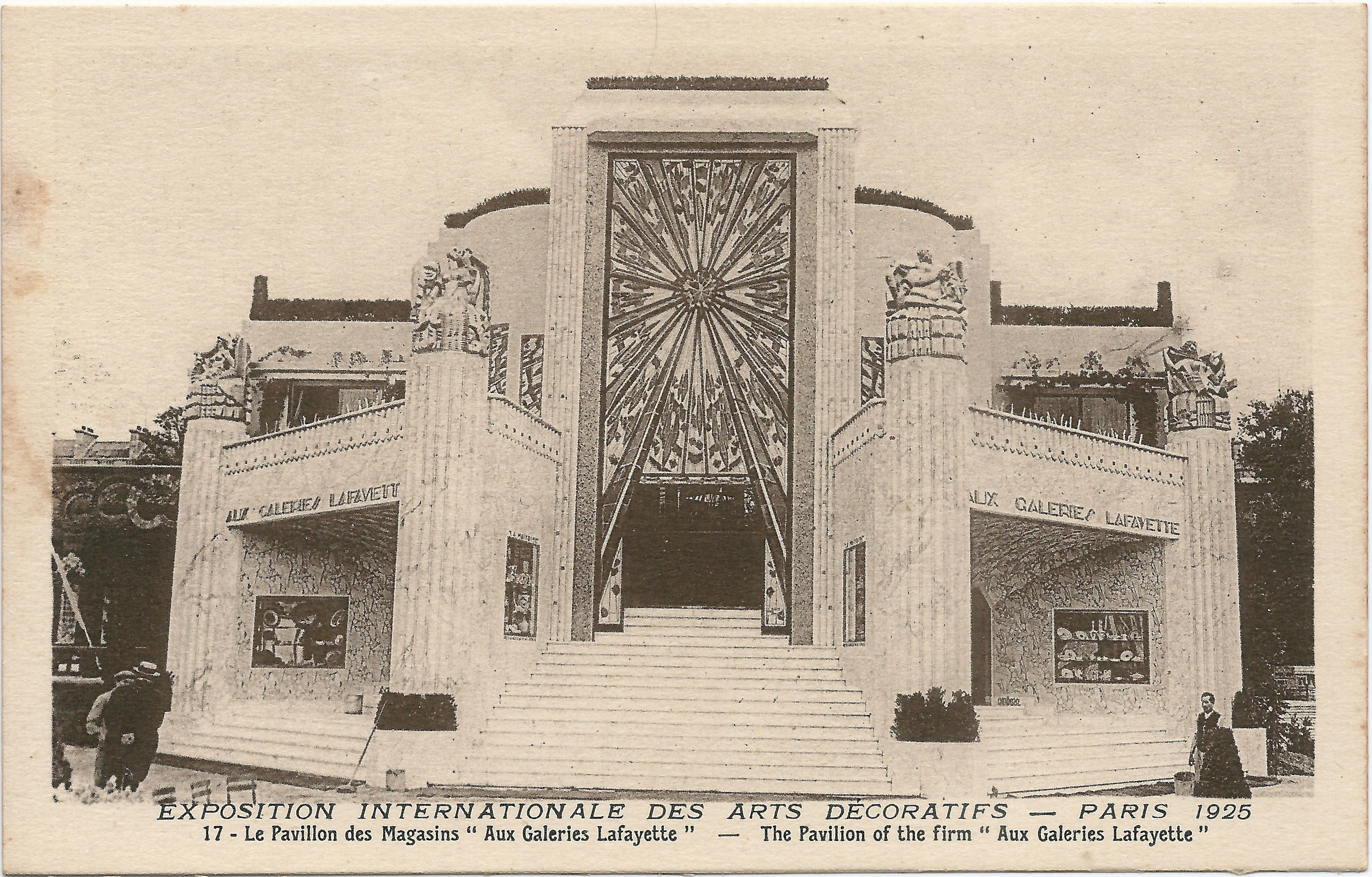
Pavilion of the Galeries Lafayette department store

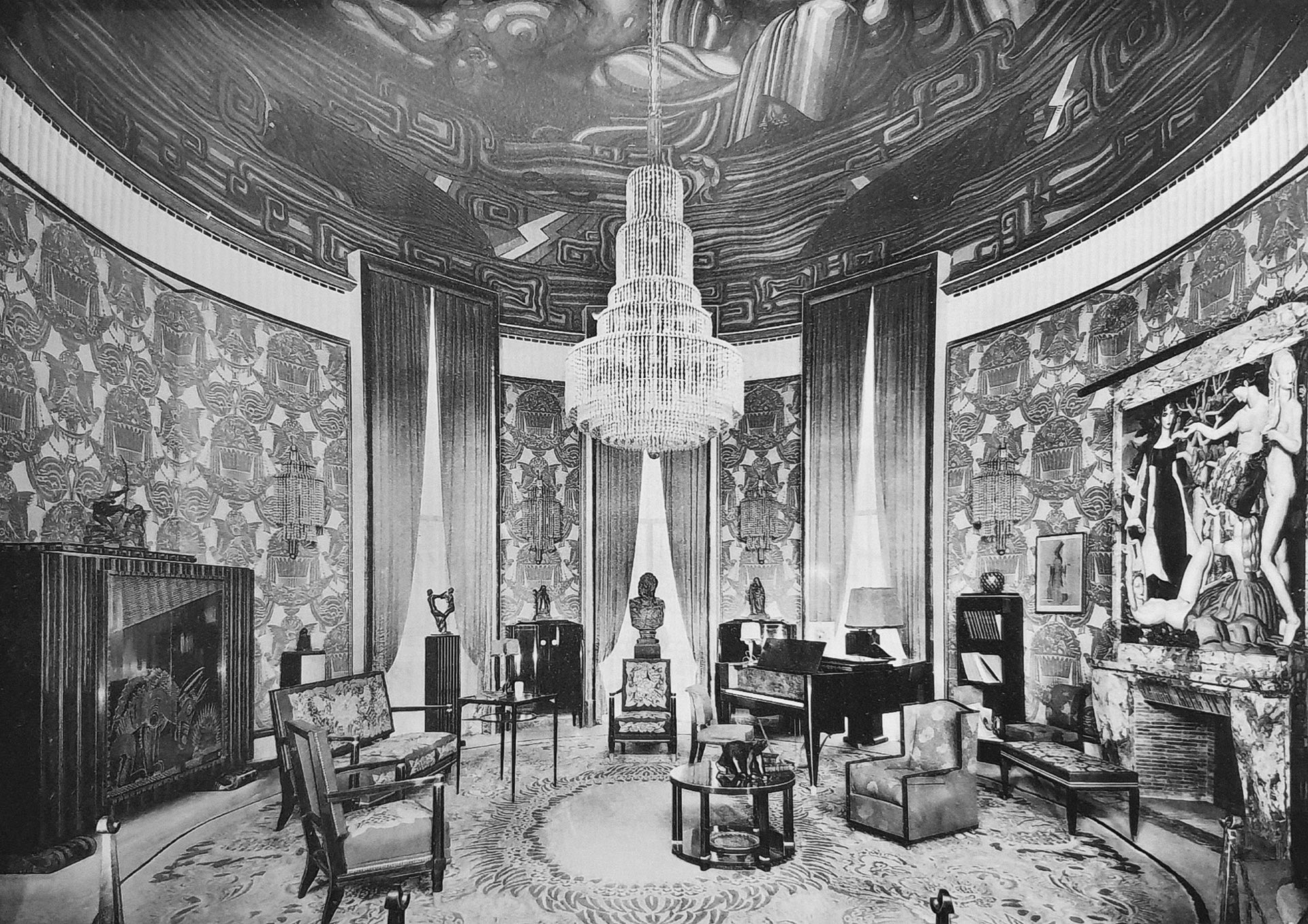
Salon of the Hôtel du Collectionneur, furnished by Émile-Jacques Ruhlmann, painting by Jean Dupas, design by Pierre Patout

The event that marked the zenith of the style and gave it its name was the International Exhibition of Modern Decorative and Industrial Arts which took place in Paris from April to October in 1925. This was officially sponsored by the French government, and covered a site in Paris of 55 acres, running from the Grand Palais on the right bank to Les Invalides on the left bank, and along the banks of the Seine. The Grand Palais, the largest hall in the city, was filled with exhibits of decorative arts from the participating countries. There were 15,000 exhibitors from twenty different countries, including Austria, Belgium, Czechoslovakia, Denmark, the United Kingdom, Italy, Japan, the Netherlands, Poland, Spain, Sweden, and the new Soviet Union. Germany was not invited because of tensions after the war; the United States, misunderstanding the purpose of the exhibit, declined to participate. The event was visited by sixteen million people during its seven-month run. The rules of the exhibition required that all work be modern; no historical styles were allowed. The main purpose of the Exhibit was to promote the French manufacturers of luxury furniture, porcelain, glass, metalwork, textiles, and other decorative products. To further promote the products, all the major Paris department stores, and major designers had their own pavilions. The Exposition had a secondary purpose in promoting products from French colonies in Africa and Asia, including ivory and exotic woods.

The Hôtel du Collectionneur was a popular attraction at the Exposition; it displayed the new furniture designs of Emile-Jacques Ruhlmann, as well as Art Deco fabrics, carpets, and a painting by Jean Dupas. The interior design followed the same principles of symmetry and geometric forms which set it apart from Art Nouveau, and bright colours, fine craftsmanship rare and expensive materials which set it apart from the strict functionality of the Modernist style. While most of the pavilions were lavishly decorated and filled with hand-made luxury furniture, two pavilions, those of the Soviet Union and Pavilion de L'Esprit Nouveau, built by the magazine of that name run by Le Corbusier, were built in an austere style with plain white walls and no decoration; they were among the earliest examples of modernist architecture.

== Late Art Deco ==
Piața Sfântul Ștefan no. 1 in Bucharest, by unknown architect (c. 1930)

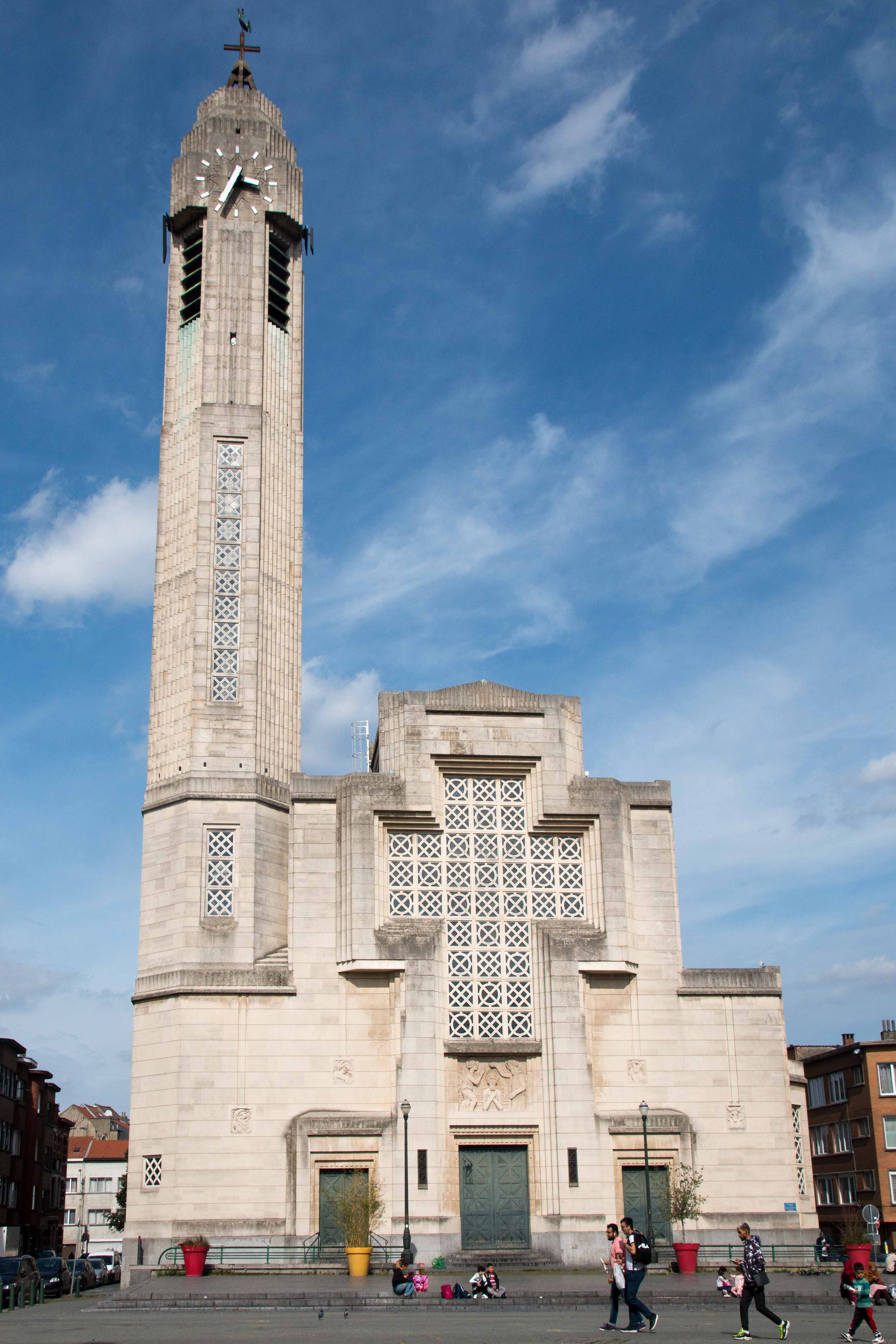
Church of St. John the Baptist in Molenbeek (Brussels), by Joseph Diongre (1930–1932)

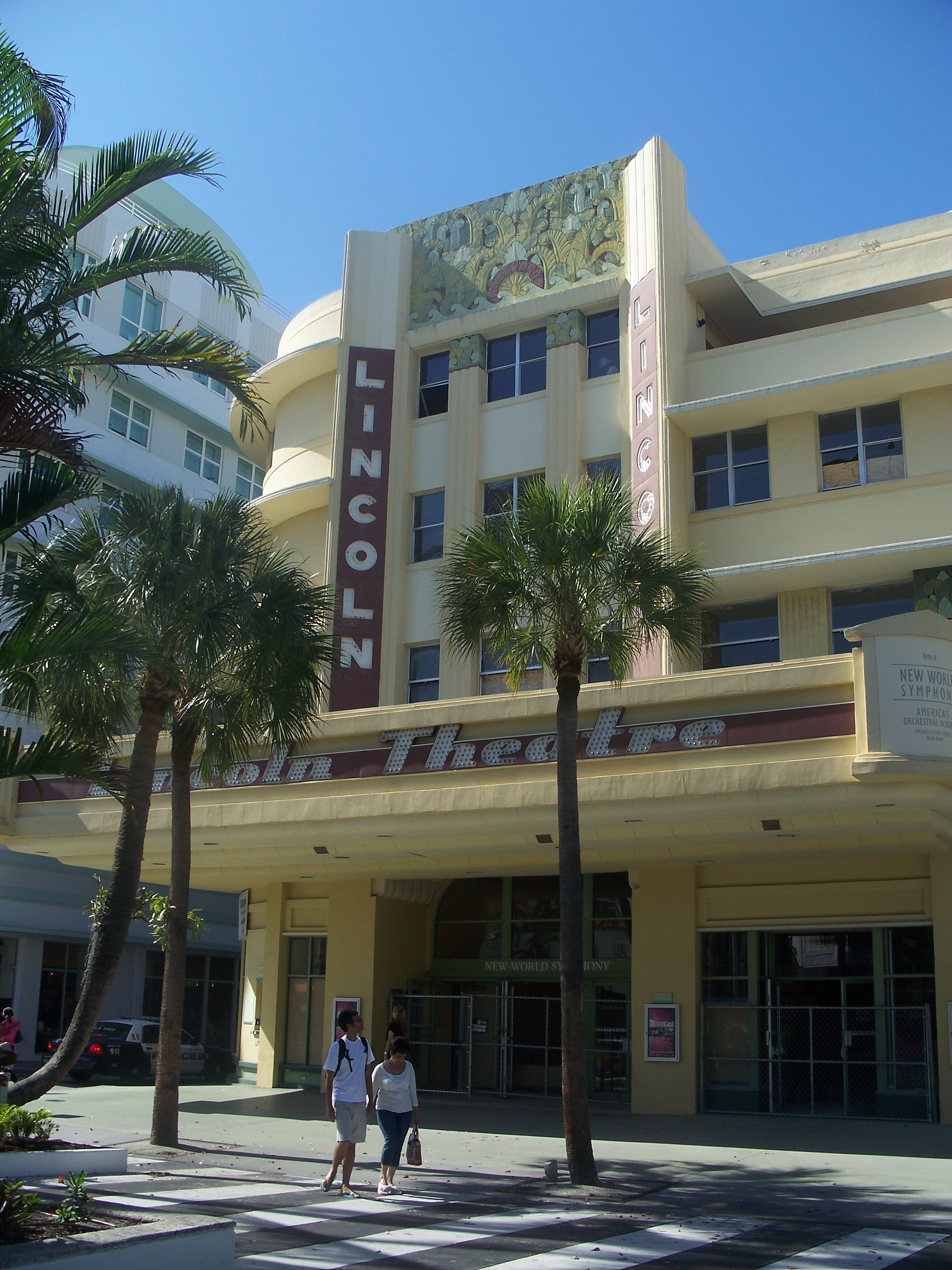
Lincoln Theater in Miami Beach, Florida, by Thomas W. Lamb (1936)

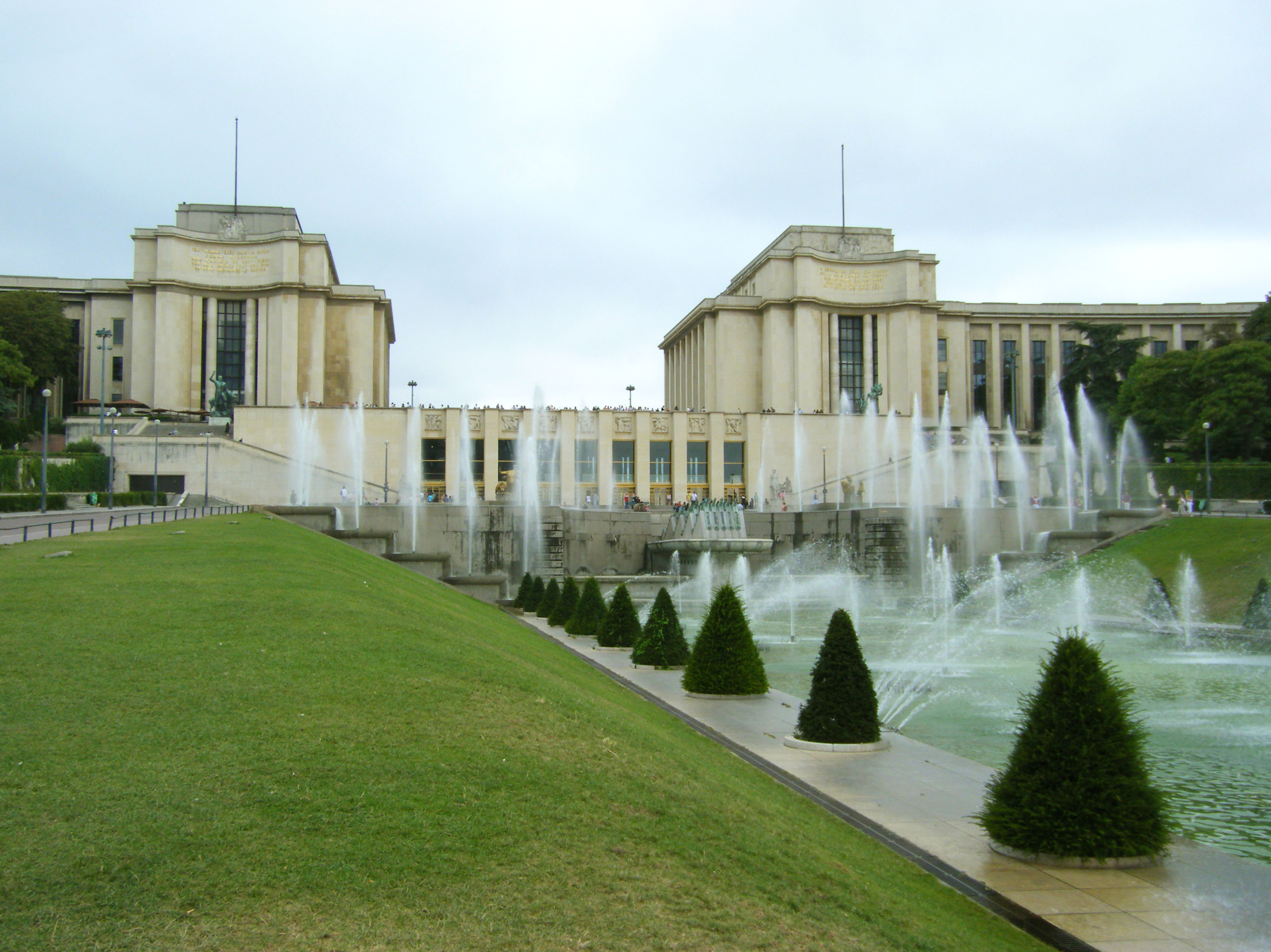
Palais de Chaillot in Paris by Louis-Hippolyte Boileau, Jacques Carlu and Léon Azéma from the 1937 Paris International Exposition

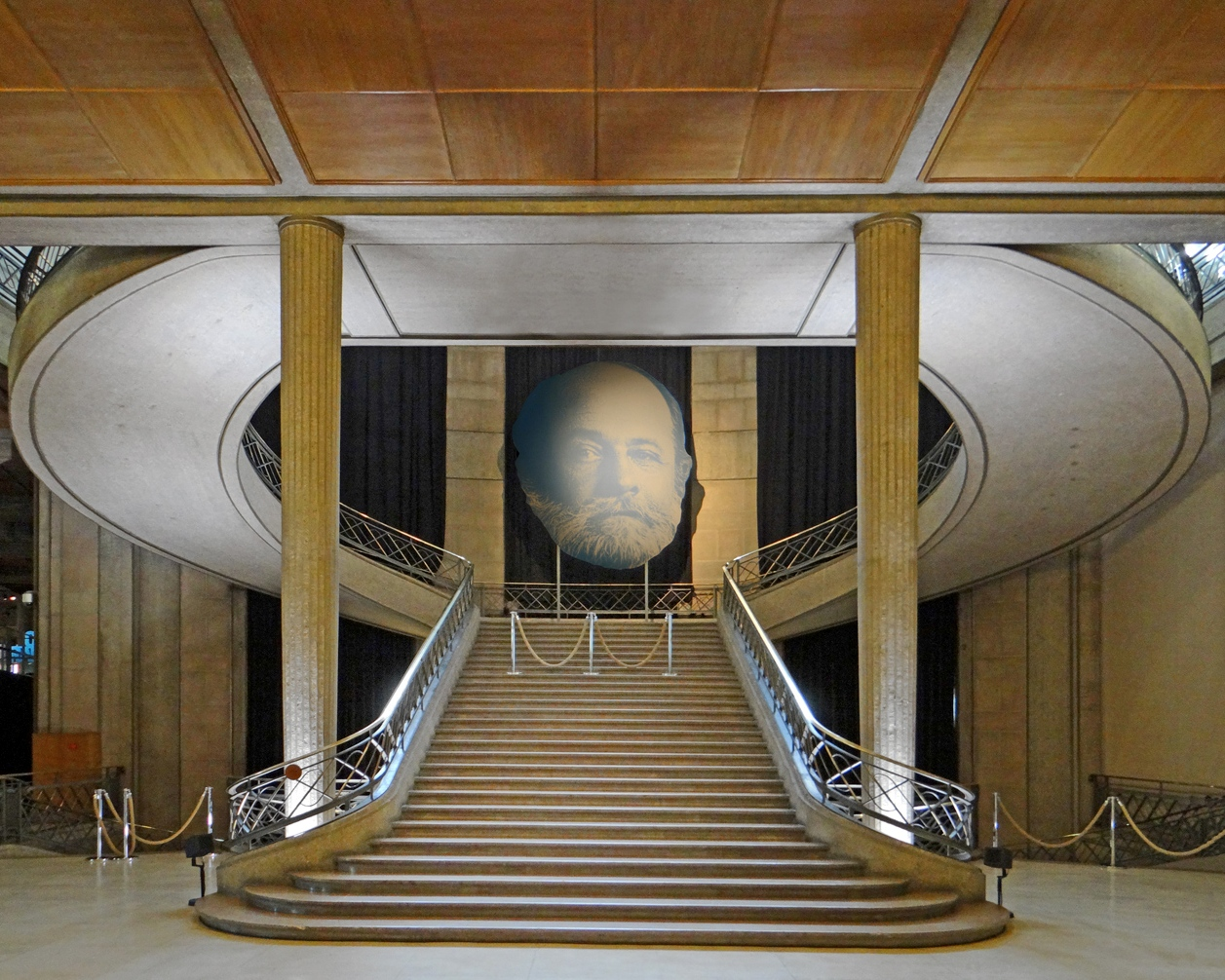
Stairway of the Economic and Social Council in Paris, originally the Museum of Public Works, built for the 1937 Exposition, by Auguste Perret (1937)

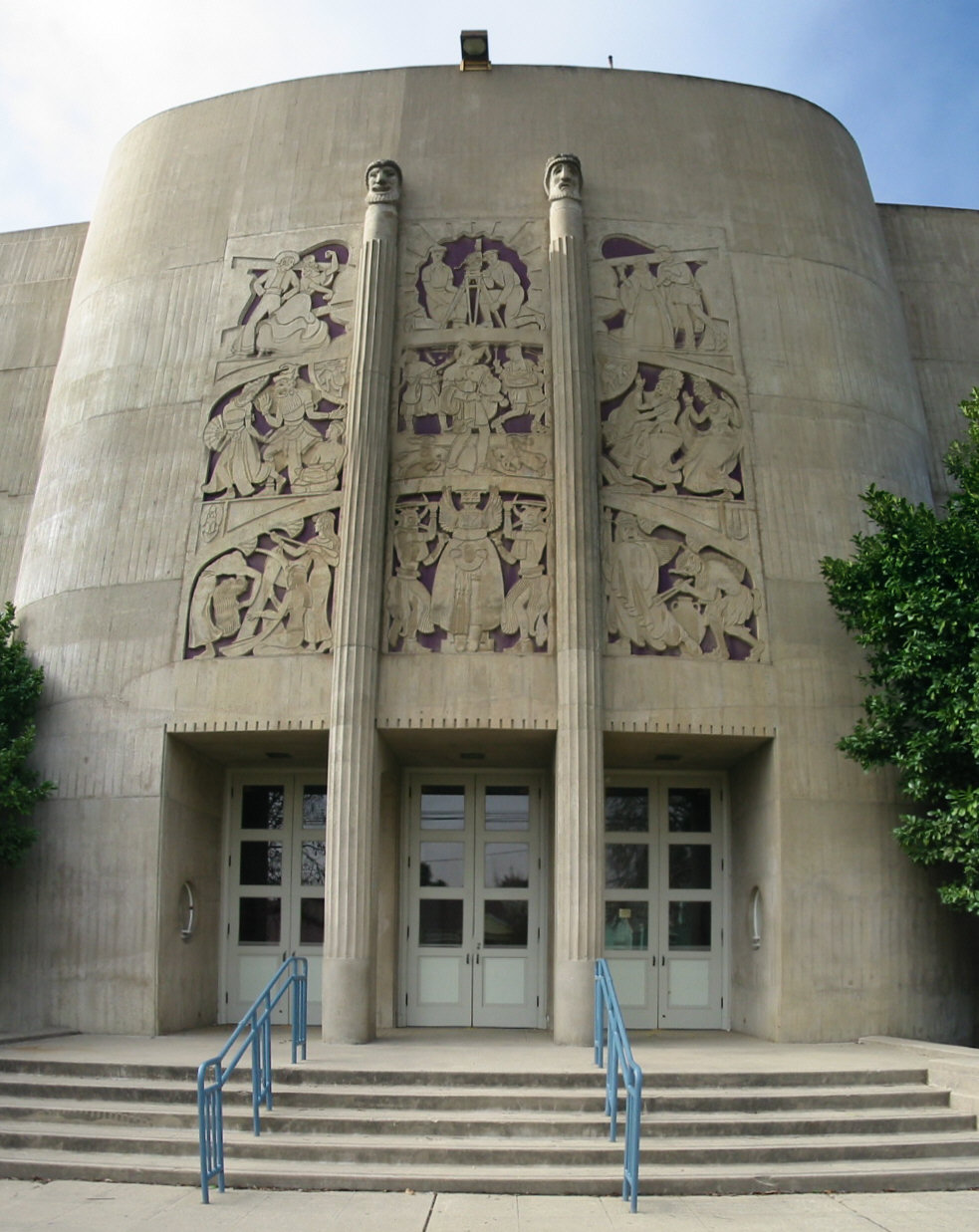
High School in King City, California, built by Robert Stanton for the Works Progress Administration (1939)

By 1925, two different competing schools coexisted within Art Deco: the traditionalists, who had founded the Society of Decorative Artists; included the furniture designer Emile-Jacques Ruhlmann, Jean Dunand, the sculptor Antoine Bourdelle, and designer Paul Poiret; they combined modern forms with traditional craftsmanship and expensive materials. On the other side were the Modernists, who increasingly rejected the past and wanted a style based upon advances in new technologies, simplicity, a lack of decoration, inexpensive materials, and mass production. The modernists founded their own organisation, The French Union of Modern Artists, in 1929. Its members included architects Pierre Chareau, Francis Jourdain, Robert Mallet-Stevens, Le Corbusier, and, in the Soviet Union, Konstantin Melnikov; the Irish designer Eileen Gray; the French designer Sonia Delaunay; and the jewellers Georges Fouquet and Jean Puiforcat. They fiercely attacked the traditional Art Deco style, criticizing Art Deco designers who focused on the creation of one-of-a-kind pieces and limited editions for their select few wealthy clientele. In the Modernists' view, the future of decorative arts was not subject solely to the aesthetic preferences of the rich, but rather "that the new age required nothing less than excellent design for everyone." They believed that form should follow function; the beauty of an object or a building resided in whether it was perfectly fit to fulfill its function. Modern industrial methods meant that, rather than needing to be crafted by hand, furniture and buildings could be mass-produced; it was also their view that mass production and quality were not necessarily mutually exclusive.

French decorative arts designer Paul Follot defended the more traditionalist, ornamental style of Art Deco in this way: "We know that the "necessary" alone is not sufficient for man and that the superfluous is indispensable for him... or otherwise let us also suppress music, flowers, perfumes... and the smiles of ladies!" However, Le Corbusier was a brilliant publicist for modernist architecture; he stated that a house was simply "a machine to live in", and tirelessly promoted the idea that Art Deco was the past and modernism was the future. Le Corbusier's ideas were gradually adopted by architecture schools, and the aesthetics of Art Deco were abandoned. The same features that made Art Deco popular in the beginning, its craftsmanship, rich materials and ornament, led to its decline. The Great Depression that began in the United States in 1929, and reached Europe shortly afterwards, greatly reduced the number of wealthy clients who could pay for the furnishings and art objects. In the Depression economic climate, few companies were ready to build new skyscrapers. Even the Ruhlmann firm resorted to producing pieces of furniture in series, rather than individual hand-made items. The last buildings built in Paris in the new style were the Museum of Public Works by Auguste Perret (now the French Economic, Social and Environmental Council), the Palais de Chaillot by Louis-Hippolyte Boileau, Jacques Carlu and Léon Azéma, and the Palais de Tokyo of the 1937 Paris International Exposition; they looked out at the grandiose pavilion of Nazi Germany, designed by Albert Speer, which faced the equally grandiose socialist-realist pavilion of Stalin's Soviet Union.

After World War II, the dominant architectural style became the International Style pioneered by Le Corbusier, and Mies van der Rohe. A handful of Art Deco hotels were built in Miami Beach after World War II, but elsewhere the style largely vanished, except in industrial design, where it continued to be used in automobile styling and products such as jukeboxes. In the 1960s, it experienced a modest academic revival, thanks in part to the writings of architectural historians such as Bevis Hillier. In the 1970s efforts were made in the United States and Europe to preserve the best examples of Art Deco architecture, and many buildings were restored and repurposed. Postmodern architecture, which first appeared in the 1980s, like Art Deco, often includes purely decorative features. Deco continues to inspire designers, and is often used in contemporary fashion, jewellery, and toiletries.

== Painting ==
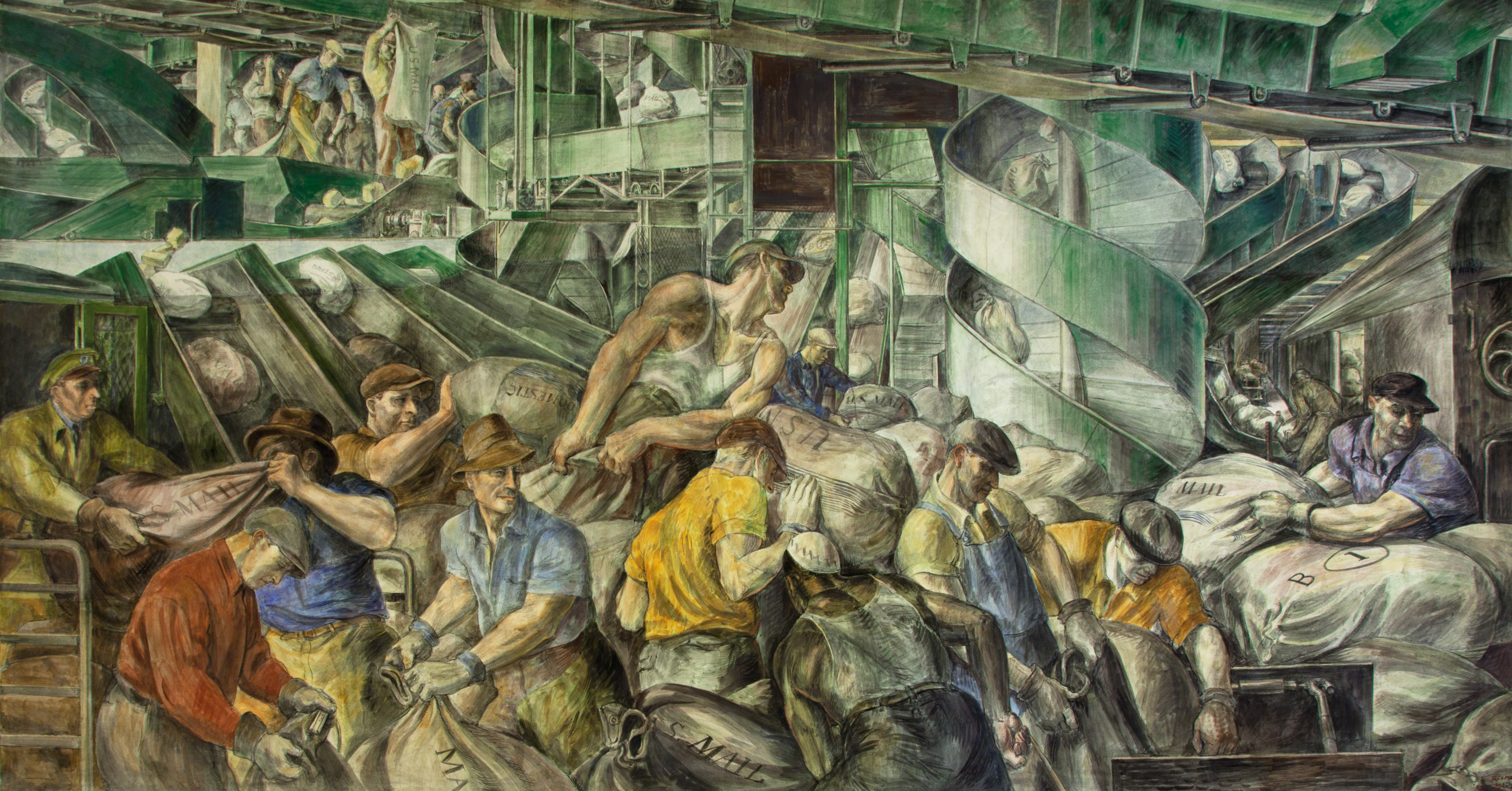
Workers sorting the mail, a mural in the Ariel Rios Federal Building, Washington, D.C., by Reginald Marsh (1936)

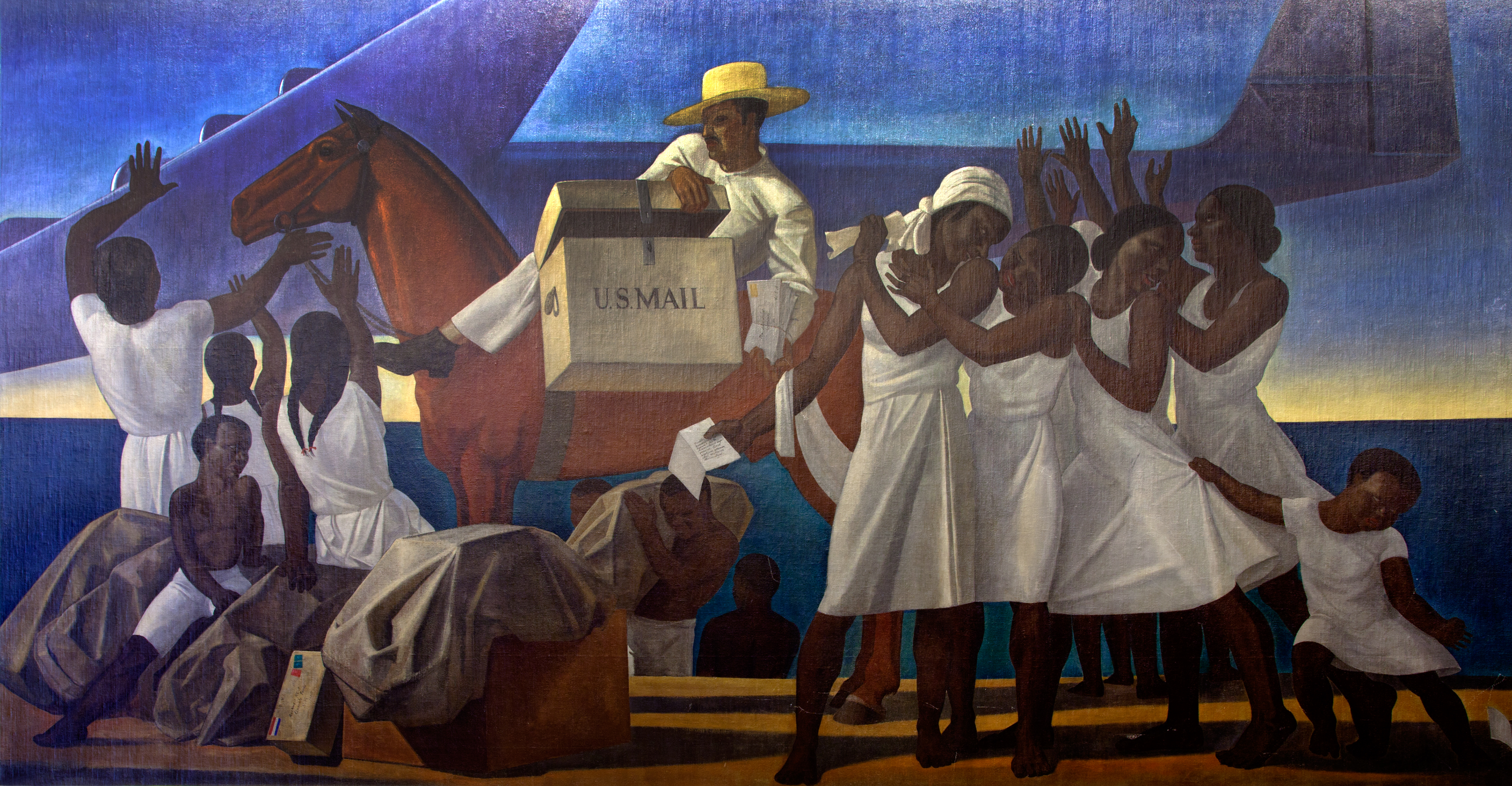
Art in the Tropics, mural in the William Jefferson Clinton Federal Building, Washington, D.C., by Rockwell Kent (1938)

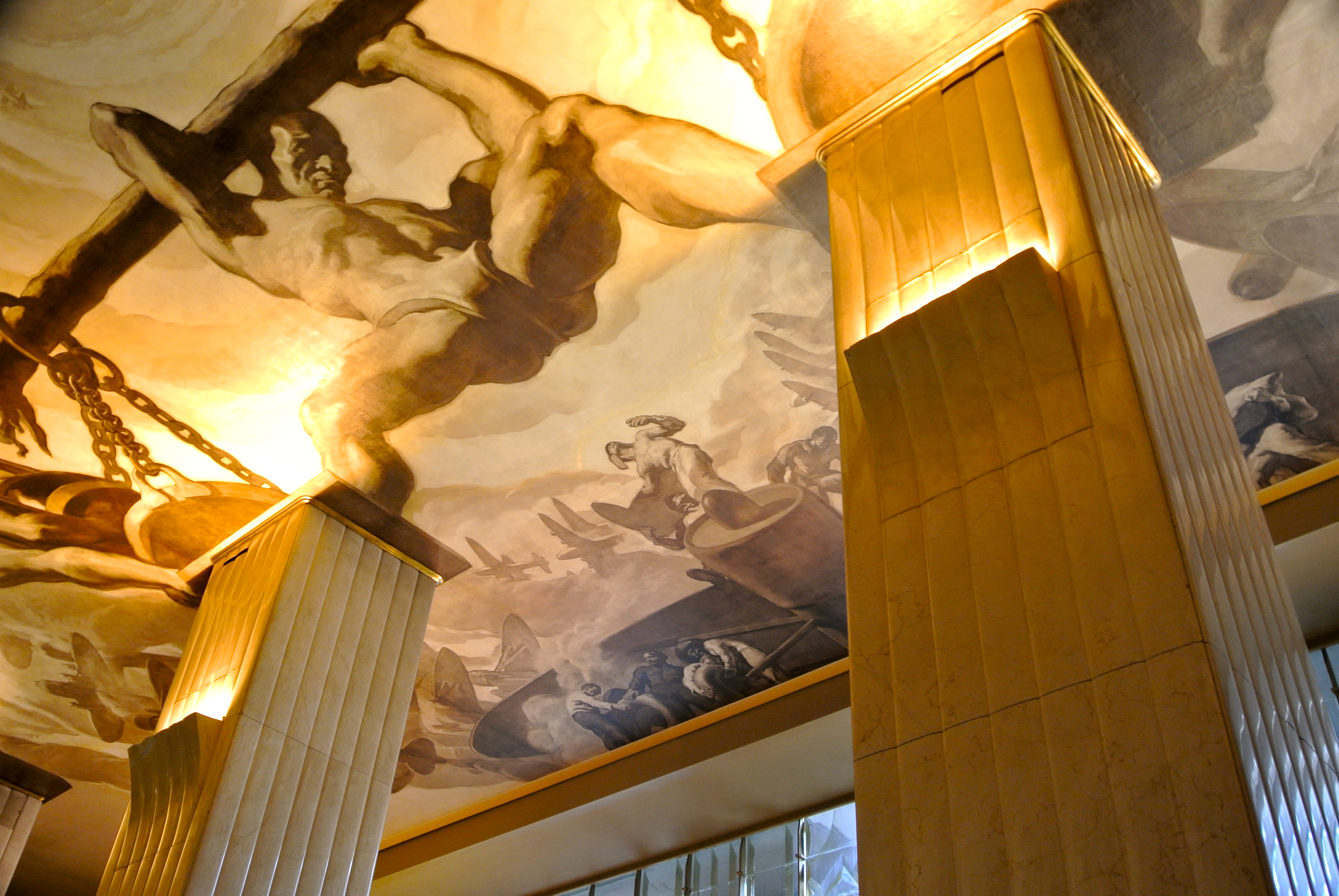
Detail of Time, ceiling mural in lobby of 30 Rockefeller Plaza in New York City, by Josep Maria Sert (1941)

The Snake by Robert Poughéon, c. 1930, on display at La Piscine Museum

There was no section set aside for painting at the 1925 Exposition. Art deco painting was by definition decorative, designed to decorate a room or work of architecture, so few painters worked exclusively in the style, but two painters are closely associated with Art Deco. Jean Dupas painted Art Deco murals for the Bordeaux Pavilion at the 1925 Decorative Arts Exposition in Paris, and also painted the picture over the fireplace in the Maison du Collectionneur exhibit at the 1925 Exposition, which featured furniture by Ruhlmann and other prominent Art Deco designers. His murals were also prominent in the décor of the French ocean liner SS Normandie. His work was purely decorative, designed as a background or accompaniment to other elements of the décor.

The other painter closely associated with the style is Tamara de Lempicka. Born in Poland, she emigrated to Paris after the Russian Revolution. She studied under Maurice Denis and André Lhote, and borrowed many elements from their styles. She painted portraits in a realistic, dynamic and colourful Art Deco style.

In the 1930s, a dramatic new form of Art Deco painting appeared in the United States. During the Great Depression, the Federal Art Project of the Works Progress Administration was created to give work to unemployed artists. Many were given the task of decorating government buildings, hospitals and schools. There was no specific Art Deco style used in the murals; artists engaged to paint murals in government buildings came from many different schools, from American regionalism to social realism; they included Reginald Marsh, Rockwell Kent and the Mexican painter Diego Rivera. The murals were Art Deco because they were all decorative and related to the activities in the building or city where they were painted: Reginald Marsh and Rockwell Kent both decorated U.S. postal buildings, and showed postal employees at work while Diego Rivera depicted automobile factory workers for the Detroit Institute of Arts. Diego Rivera's mural Man at the Crossroads (1933) for 30 Rockefeller Plaza featured an unauthorized portrait of Lenin. When Rivera refused to remove Lenin, the painting was destroyed and a new mural was painted by the Spanish artist Josep Maria Sert.

== Sculpture ==
=== Monumental and public sculpture ===
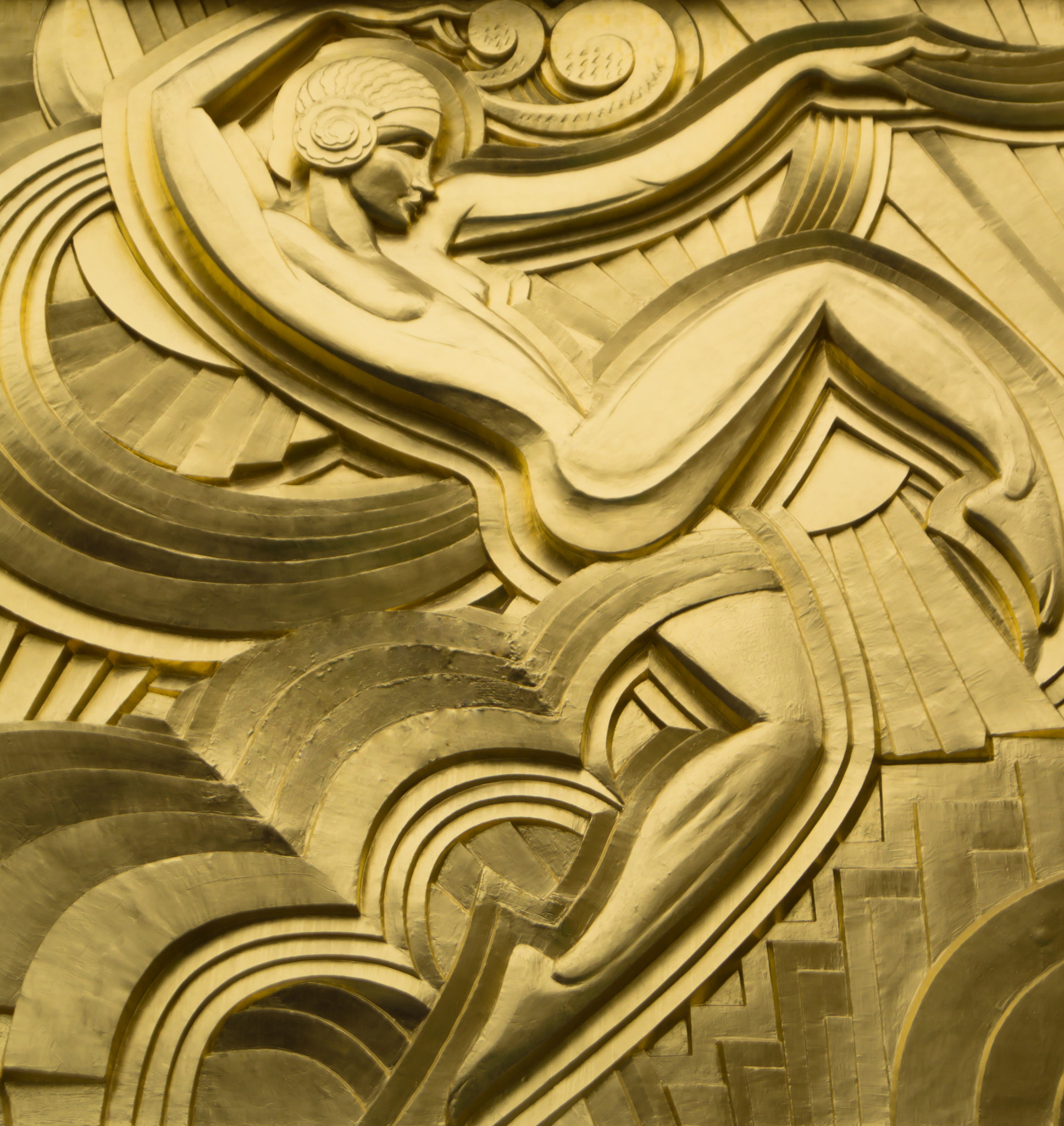
Gold detail on the façade of the Folies Bergère cabaret music hall in Paris, by Maurice Pico (1926)

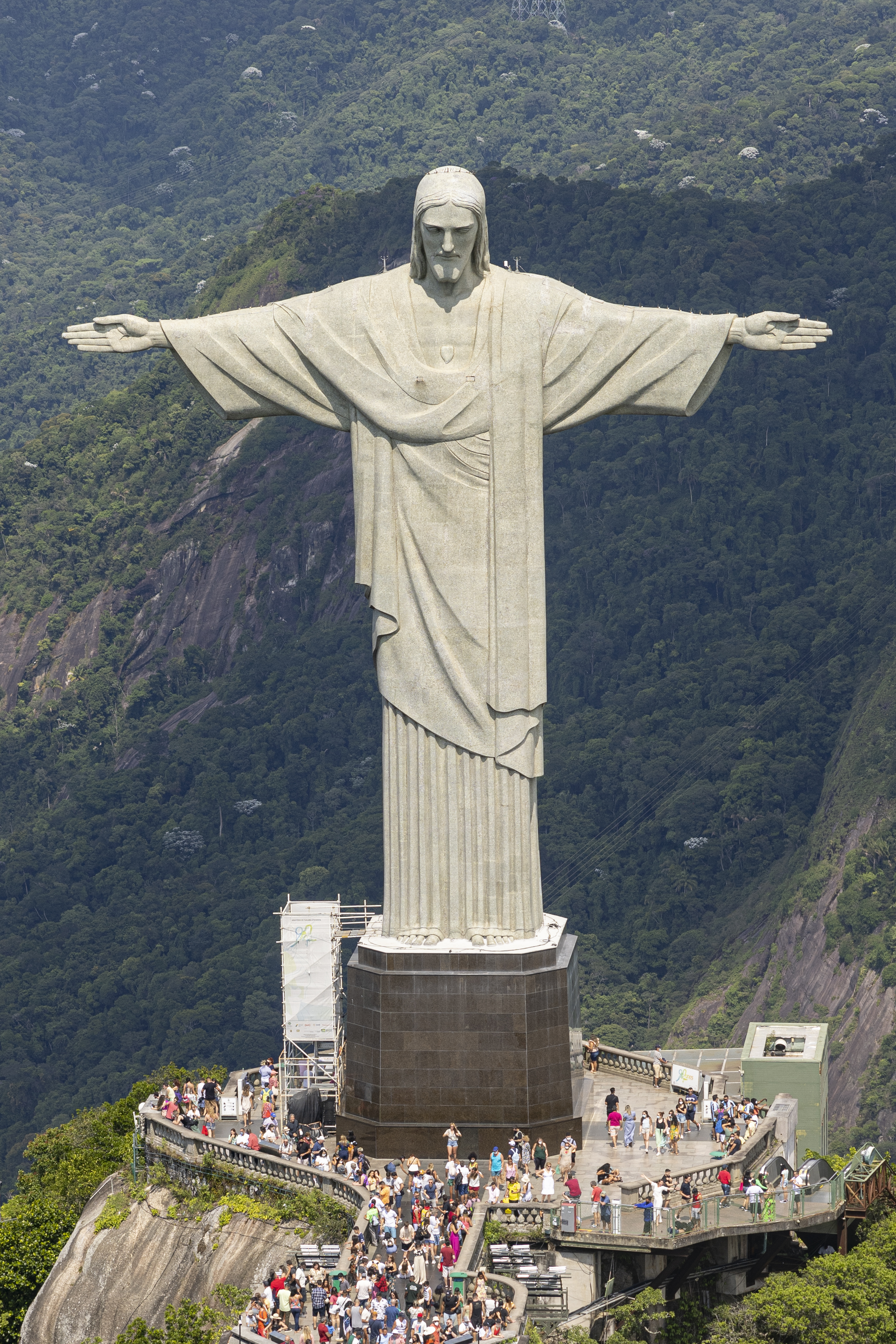
Christ the Redeemer, reinforced concrete and soapstone sculpture on Corcovado Mountain, Rio de Janeiro, by Paul Landowski (1931)

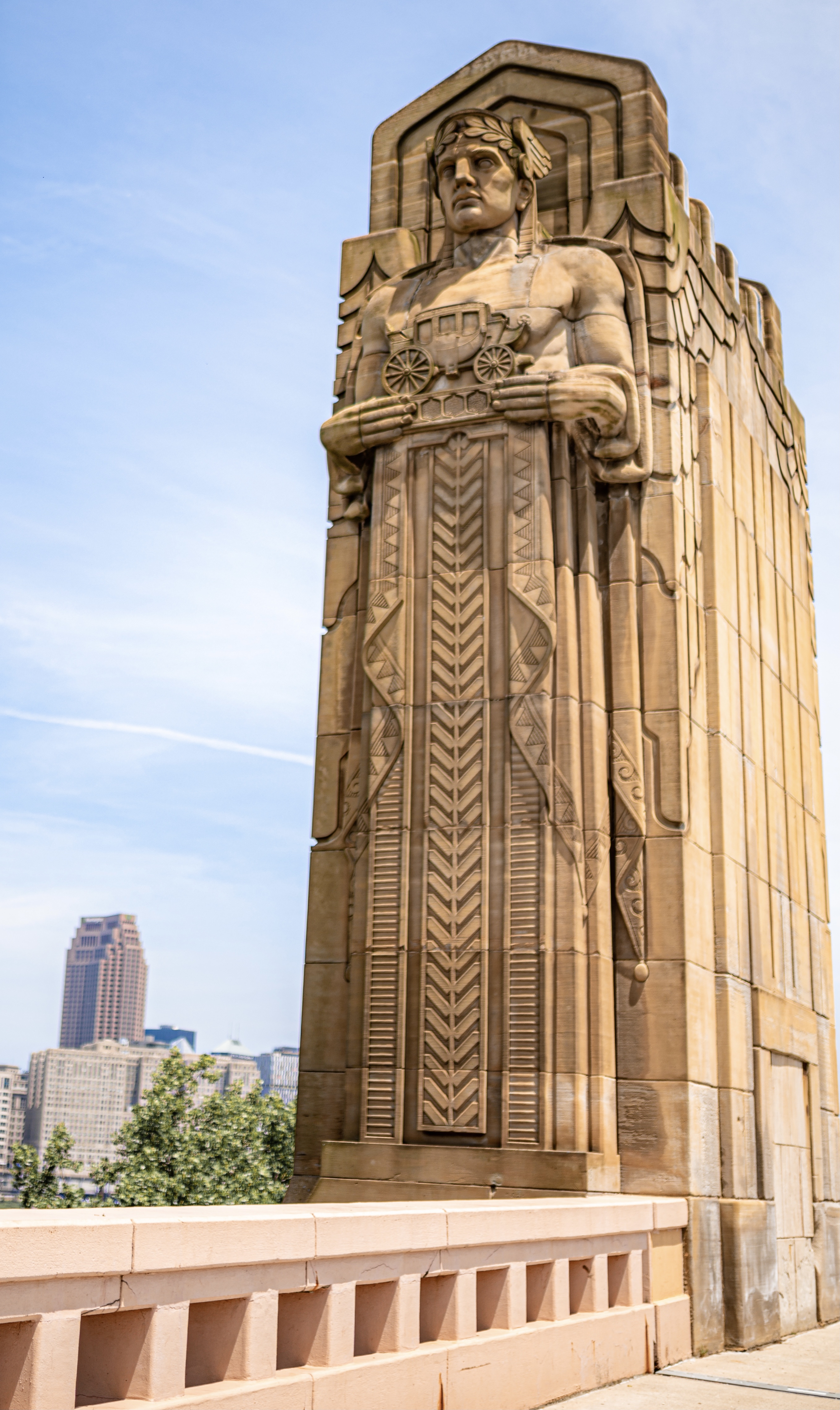
Guardians of Traffic, pylon on Hope Memorial Bridge in Cleveland, Ohio, by Henry Hering and Frank Walker (1932)

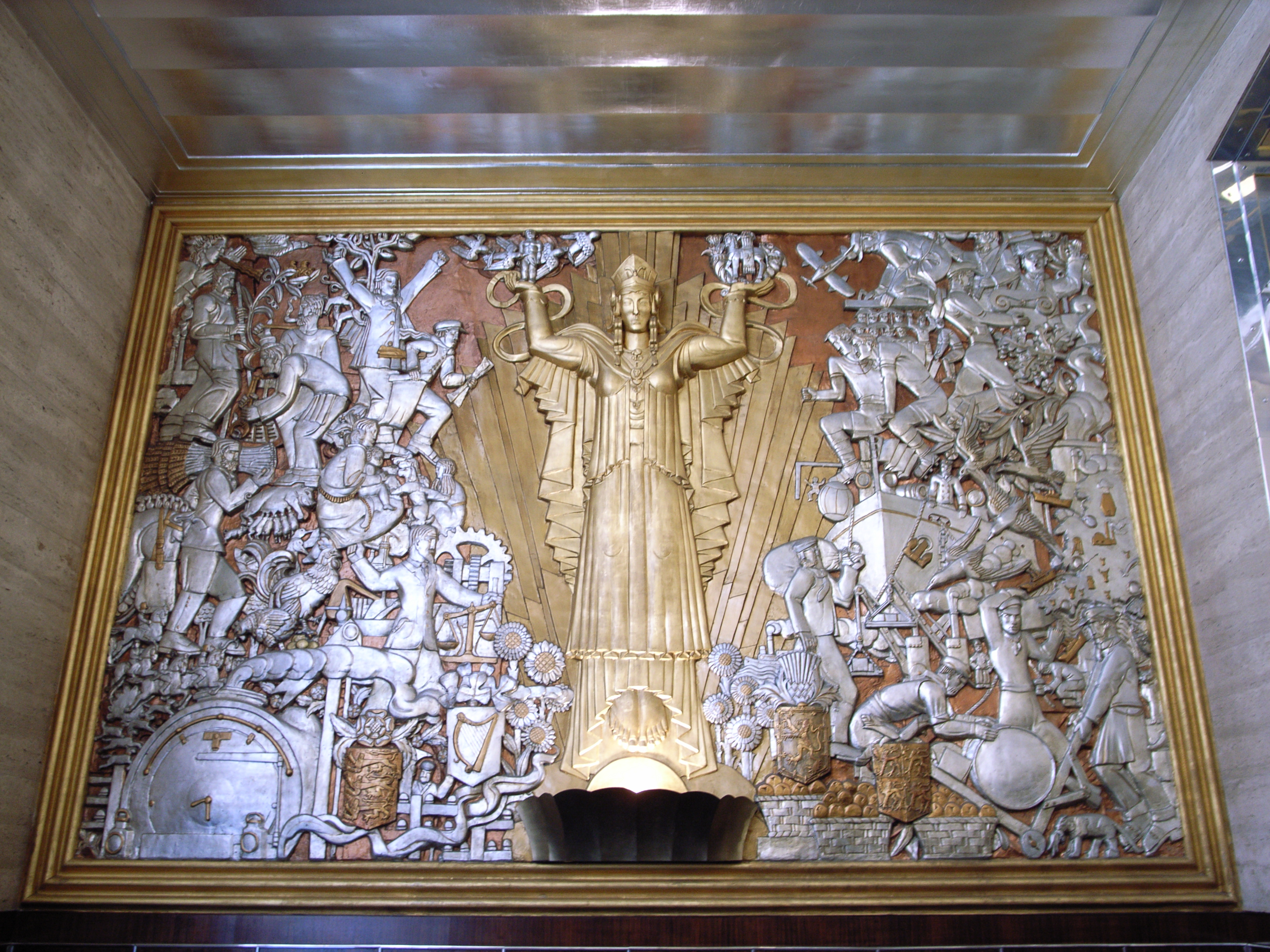
Britain, relief sculpture in the lobby of the former Daily Express Building in London, by Ronald Atkinson (1932)

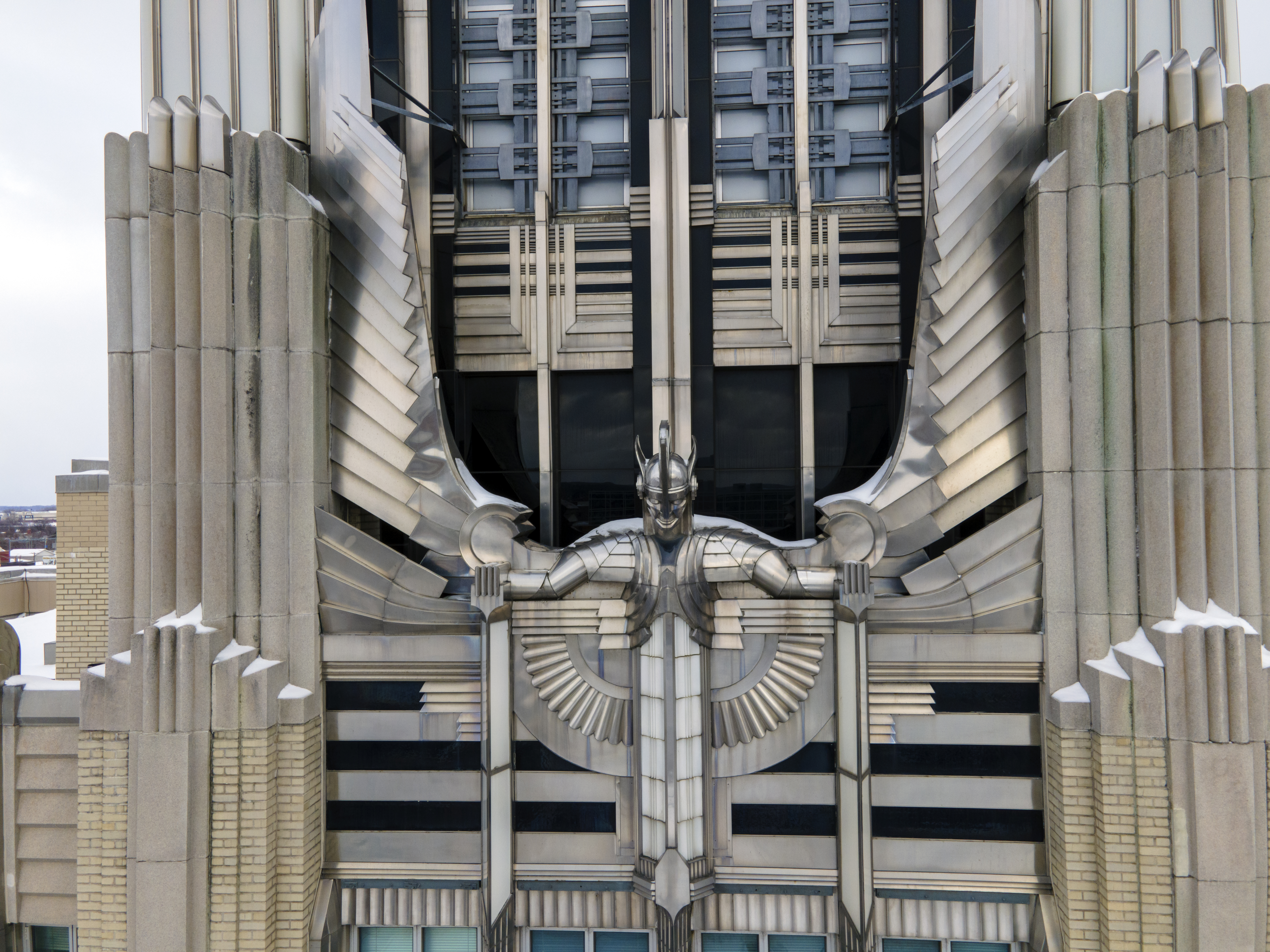
Spirit of Light or Spirit of Power, metal sculpture on the façade of the Niagara Mohawk Building in Syracuse, N.Y., by Clayton Frye (1932)

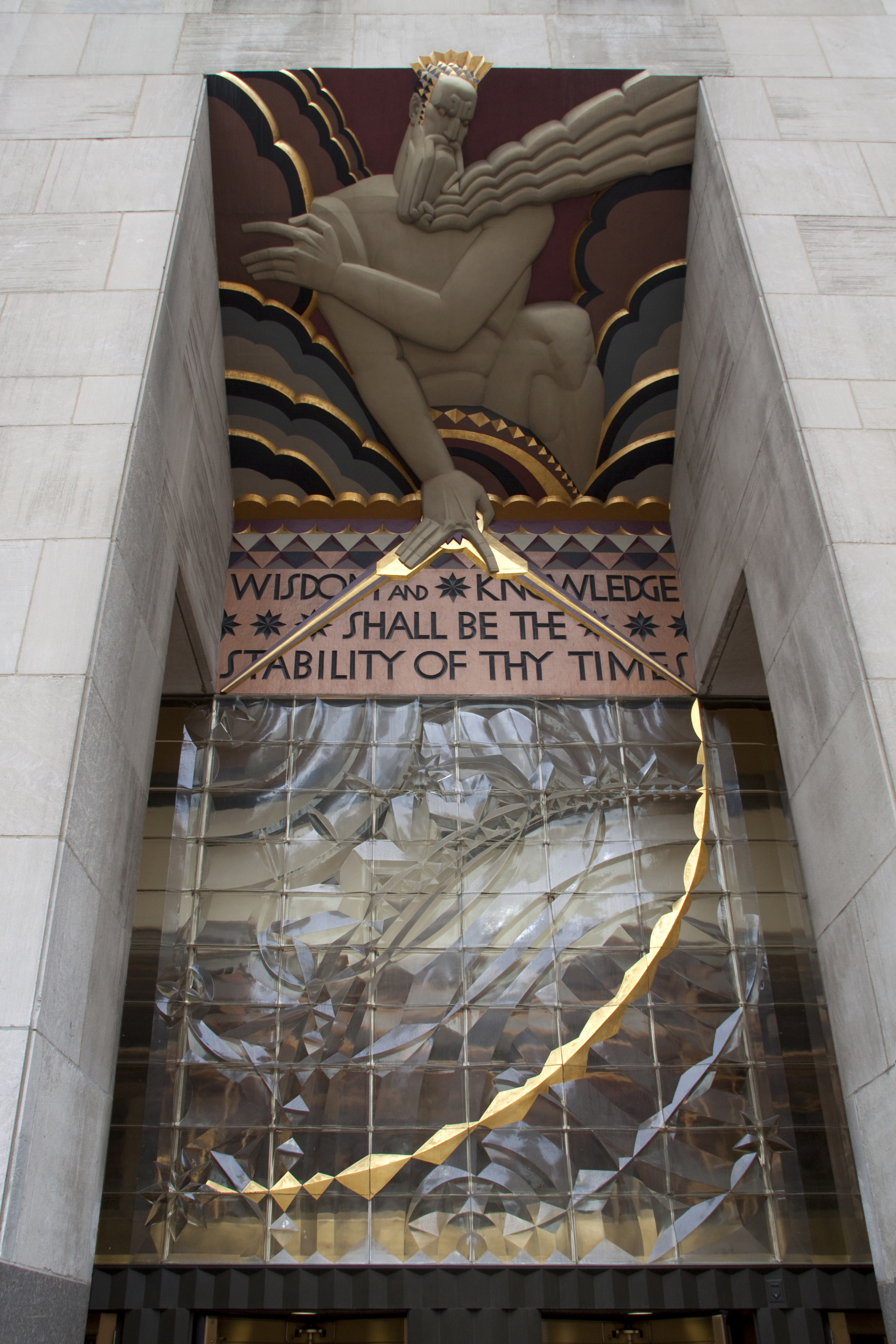
Wisdom, portal decoration at the Rockefeller Center in New York City, by Lee Lawrie (1933)

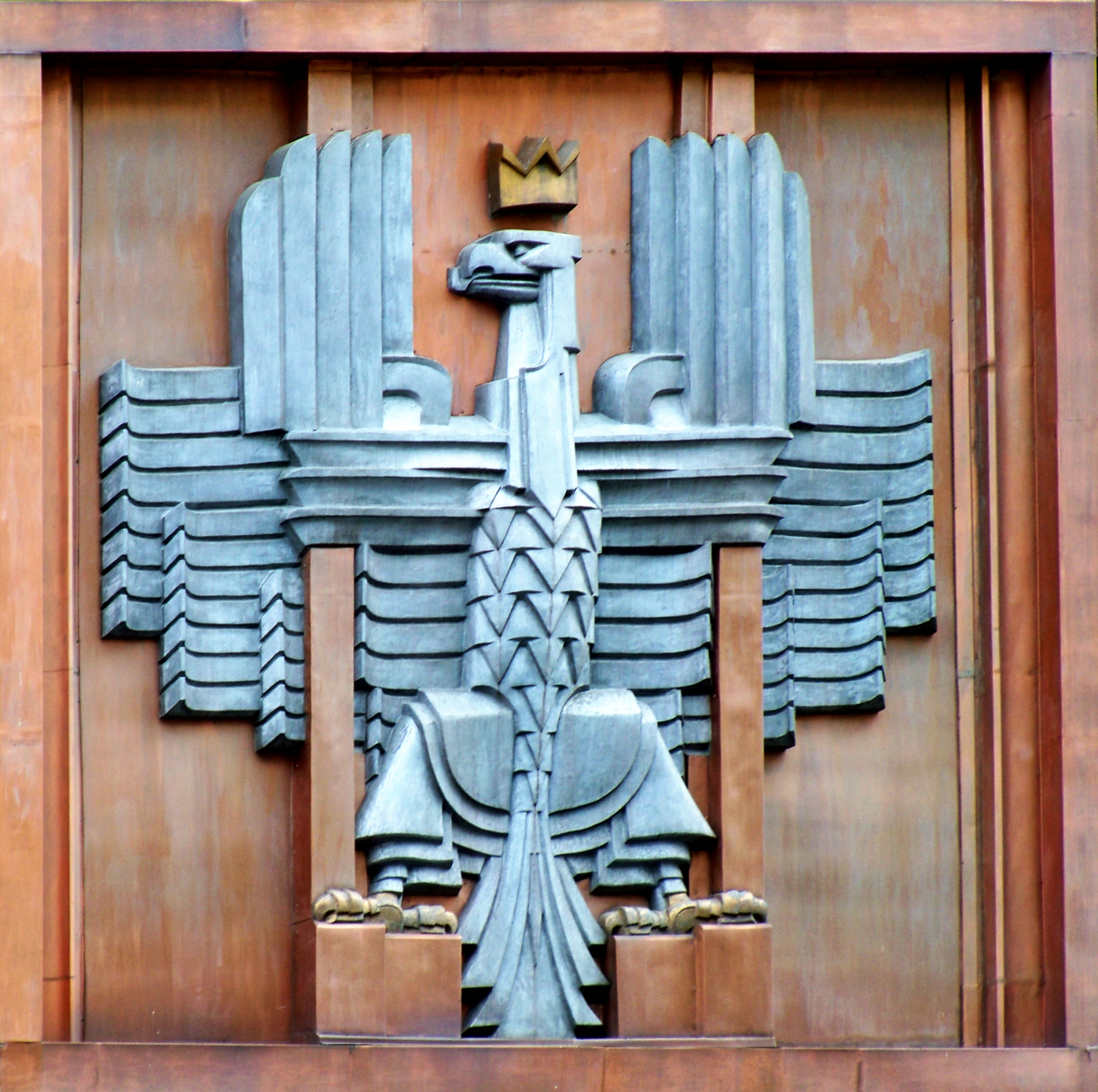
Polish coat of arms (unofficial) on the façade of the post office in Warsaw, by Julian Puterman-Sadłowski (1934)

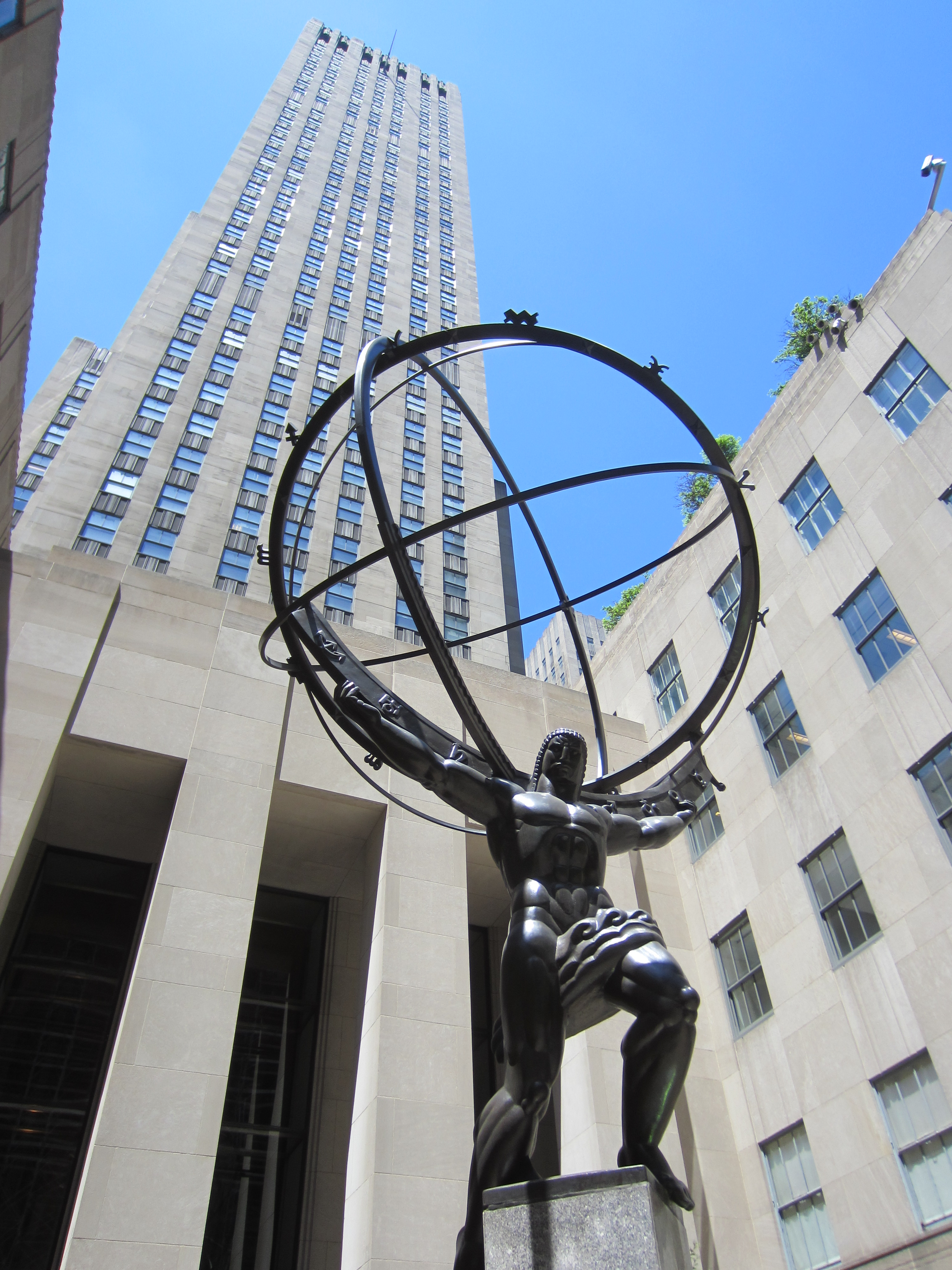
Atlas, bronze sculpture in front of the Rockefeller Center, by Lawrie (1936–37)

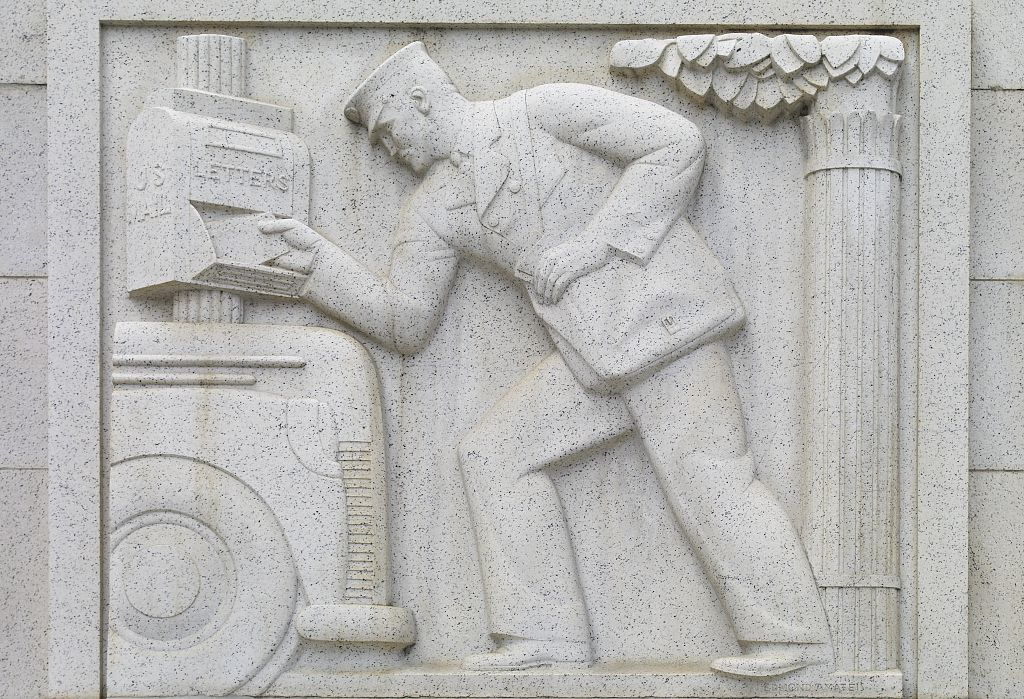
Mail Delivery East, one of four bas-relief sculptures on the Nix Federal Building in Philadelphia, Pennsylvania, by Edmond Amateis (1937)

Man Controlling Trade at the Federal Trade Commission Building in Washington, D.C., by Michael Lantz (1942)

Sculpture was a very common and integral feature of Art Deco architecture. In France, allegorical bas-reliefs representing dance and music by Antoine Bourdelle decorated the earliest Art Deco landmark in Paris, the Théâtre des Champs-Élysées, in 1912. The 1925 Exposition had major sculptural works placed around the site, pavilions were decorated with sculptural friezes, and several pavilions devoted to smaller studio sculpture. In the 1930s, a large group of prominent sculptors made works for the 1937 Exposition Internationale des Arts et Techniques dans la Vie Moderne at Chaillot. Alfred Janniot made the relief sculptures on the façade of the Palais de Tokyo. The Musée d'Art Moderne de la Ville de Paris, and the esplanade in front of the Palais de Chaillot, facing the Eiffel Tower, was crowded with new statuary by Charles Malfray, Henry Arnold, and many others.

Public Art Deco sculpture was almost always representational, usually of heroic or allegorical figures related to the purpose of the building or room. The themes were usually selected by the patrons, not the artist. Abstract sculpture for decoration was extremely rare.

In the United States, the most prominent Art Deco sculptor for public art was Paul Manship, who updated classical and mythological subjects and themes in an Art Deco style. His most famous work was the statue of Prometheus at Rockefeller Center in New York City, a 20th-century adaptation of a classical subject. Other important works for Rockefeller Center were made by Lee Lawrie, including the sculptural façade and the Atlas statue.

During the Great Depression in the United States, many sculptors were commissioned to make works for the decoration of federal government buildings, with funds provided by the WPA, or Works Progress Administration. They included sculptor Sidney Biehler Waugh, who created stylized and idealized images of workers and their tasks for federal government office buildings. In San Francisco, Ralph Stackpole provided sculpture for the façade of the new San Francisco Stock Exchange building. In Washington D.C., Michael Lantz made works for the Federal Trade Commission building.

In Britain, Deco public statuary was made by Eric Gill for the BBC Broadcasting House, while Ronald Atkinson decorated the lobby of the former Daily Express Building in London (1932).

One of the best known and certainly the largest public Art Deco sculpture is the Christ the Redeemer by the French sculptor Paul Landowski, completed between 1922 and 1931, located on a mountain top overlooking Rio de Janeiro, Brazil.

=== Studio sculpture ===
Tête (front and side view), limestone, by Joseph Csaky (c. 1920), Kröller-Müller Museum, Otterlo, Netherlands

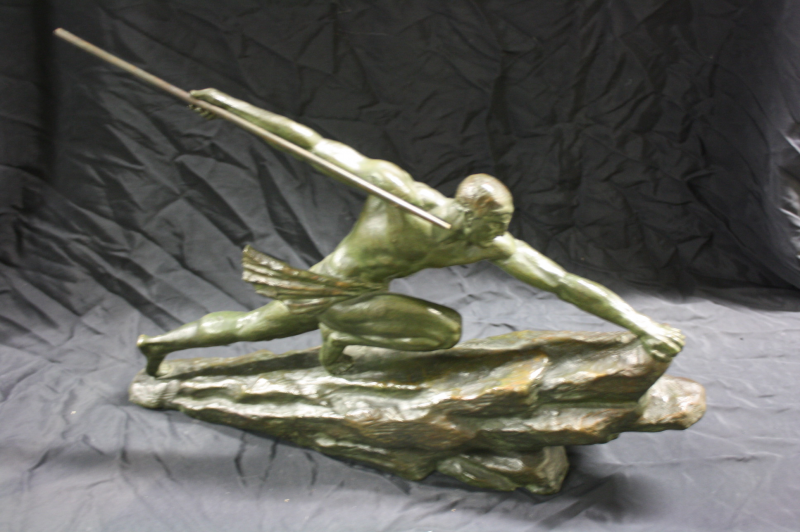
The Hunter by Pierre Le Faguays (1920s)

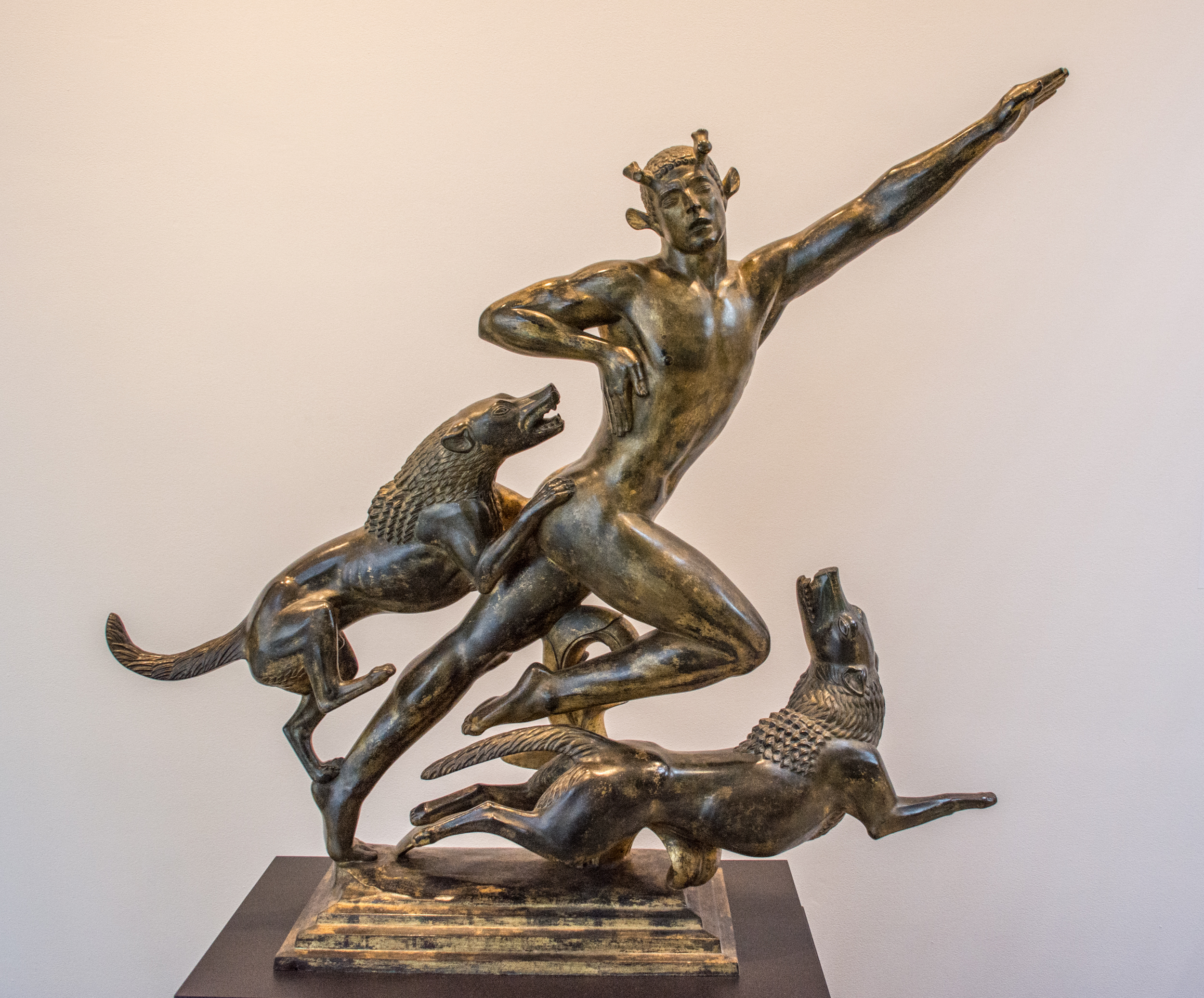
Actaeon by Paul Manship (1925), in a temporary exhibition called the "Jazz Age" at the Cleveland Museum of Art, US

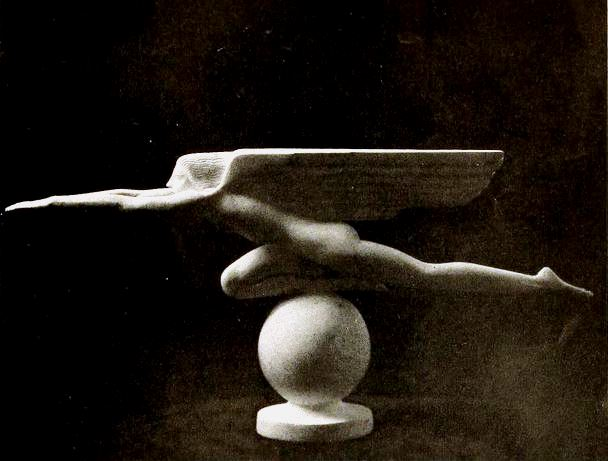
Speed, a design for a radiator ornament by Harriet Whitney Frishmuth (1925)

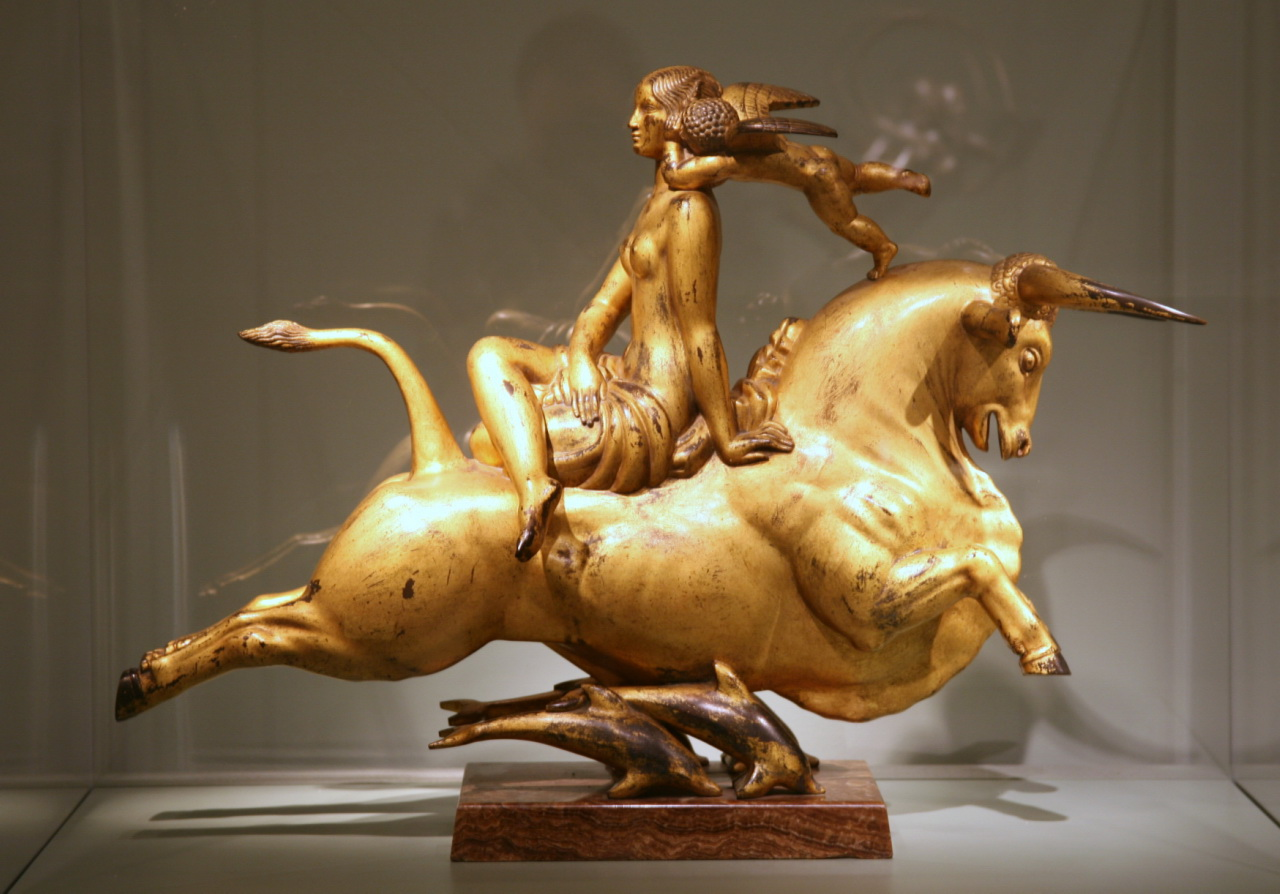
The Flight of Europa, bronze with gold leaf, by Paul Manship (1925), Whitney Museum of American Art, New York City

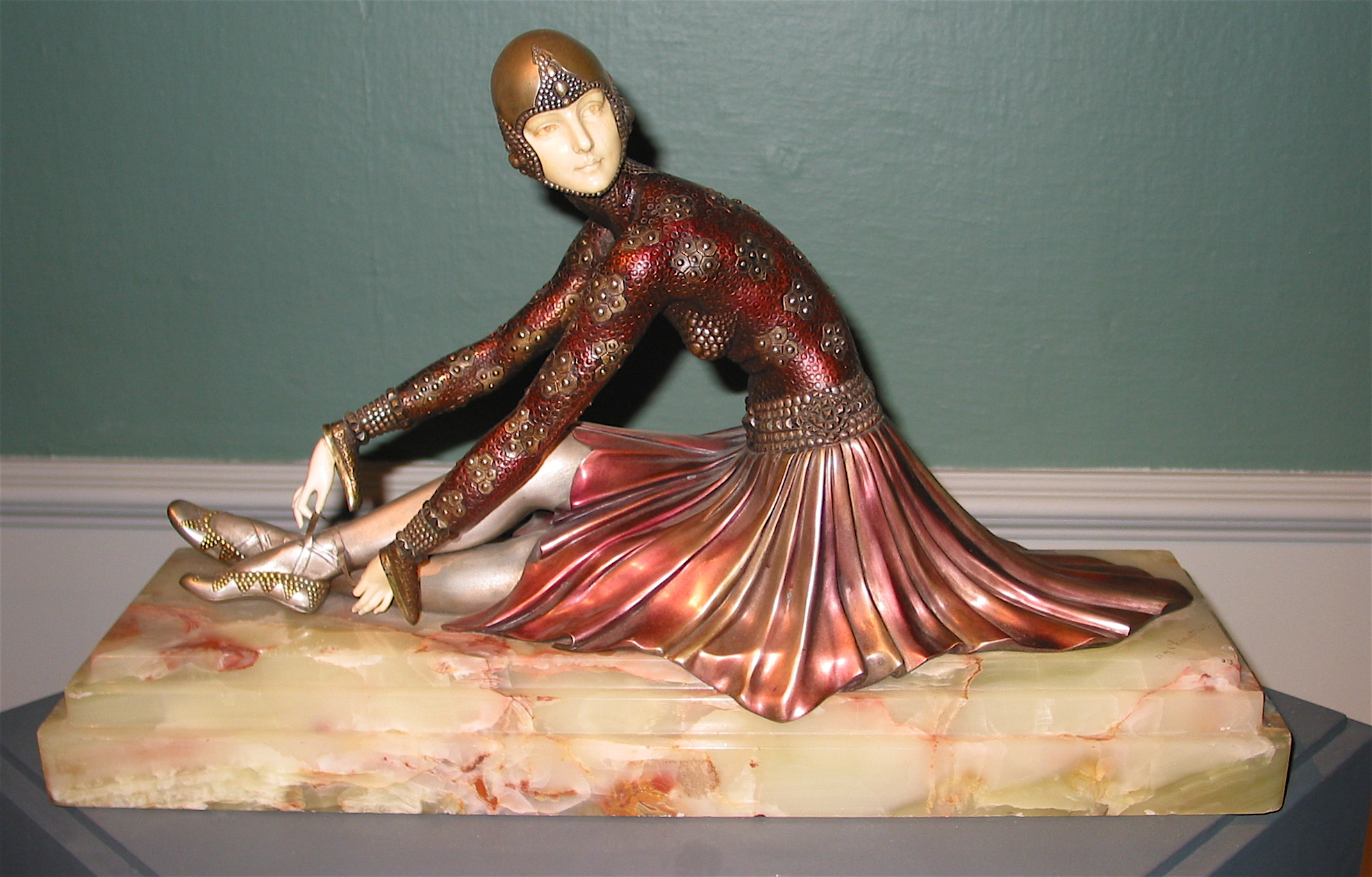
Tânără (Girl), bronze, ivory and onyx, by Demétre Chiparus (c. 1925)

Many early Art Deco sculptures were small, designed to decorate salons. One genre of this sculpture was called the Chryselephantine statuette, named for a style of ancient Greek temple statues made of gold and ivory. They were sometimes made of bronze, or sometimes with much more lavish materials, such as ivory, onyx, alabaster, and gold leaf.

One of the best-known Art Deco salon sculptors was the Romanian-born Demétre Chiparus, who produced colourful small sculptures of dancers. Other notable salon sculptors included Ferdinand Preiss, Josef Lorenzl, Alexander Kelety, Dorothea Charol and Gustav Schmidtcassel. Another important American sculptor in the studio format was Harriet Whitney Frishmuth, who had studied with Auguste Rodin in Paris.

Pierre Le Paguays was a prominent Art Deco studio sculptor, whose work was shown at the 1925 Exposition. He worked with bronze, marble, ivory, onyx, gold, alabaster and other precious materials.

François Pompon was a pioneer of modern stylised animalier sculpture. He was not fully recognised for his artistic accomplishments until the age of 67 at the Salon d'Automne of 1922 with the work Ours blanc, also known as The White Bear, now in the Musée d'Orsay in Paris.

Parallel with these Art Deco sculptors, more avant-garde and abstract modernist sculptors were at work in Paris and New York City. The most prominent were Constantin Brâncuși, Joseph Csaky, Alexander Archipenko, Henri Laurens, Jacques Lipchitz, Gustave Miklos, Jean Lambert-Rucki, Jan et Joël Martel, Chana Orloff and Pablo Gargallo.

== Graphic arts ==
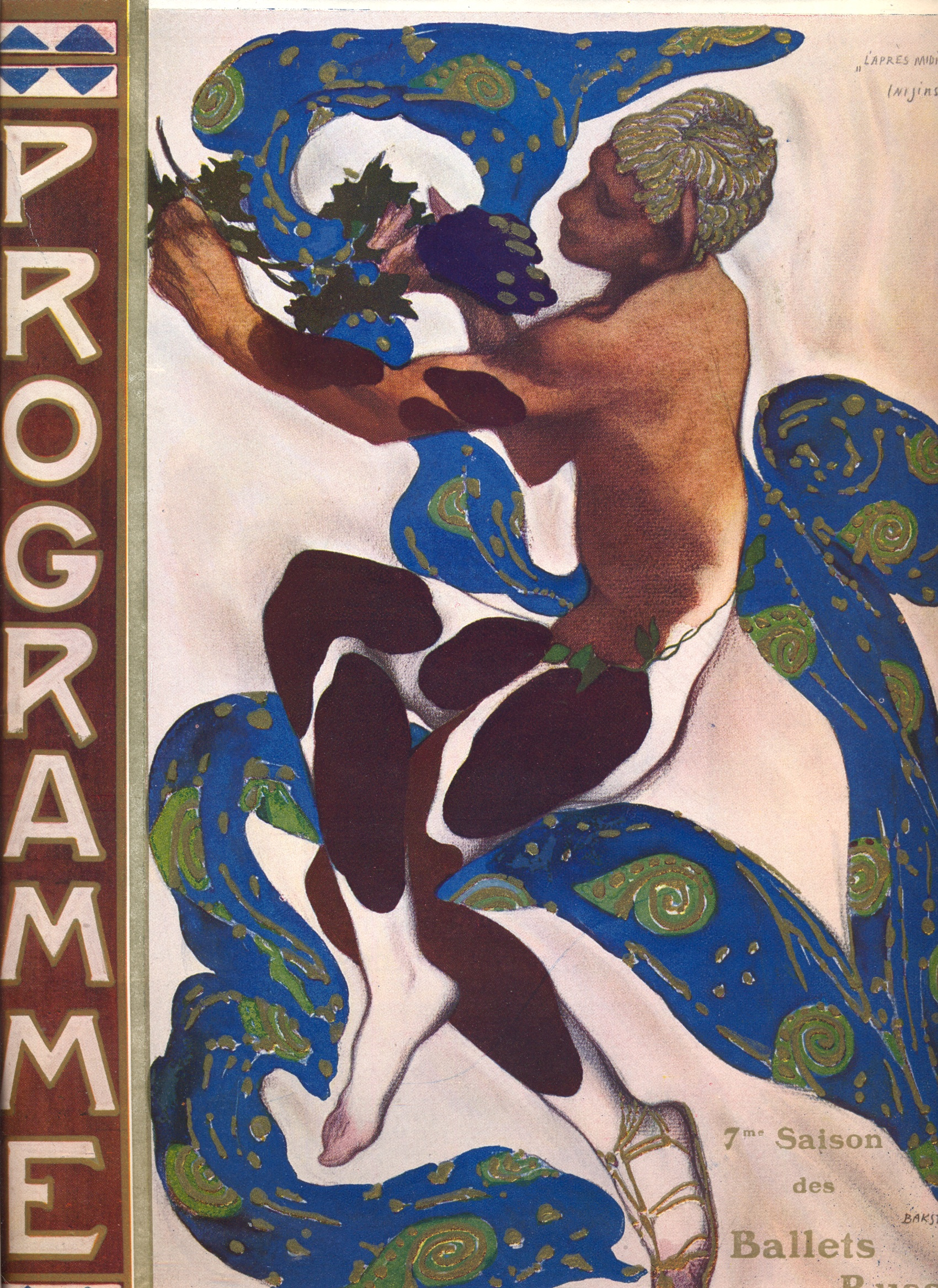
Program design for Afternoon of a Faun by Léon Bakst for Ballets Russes (1912)

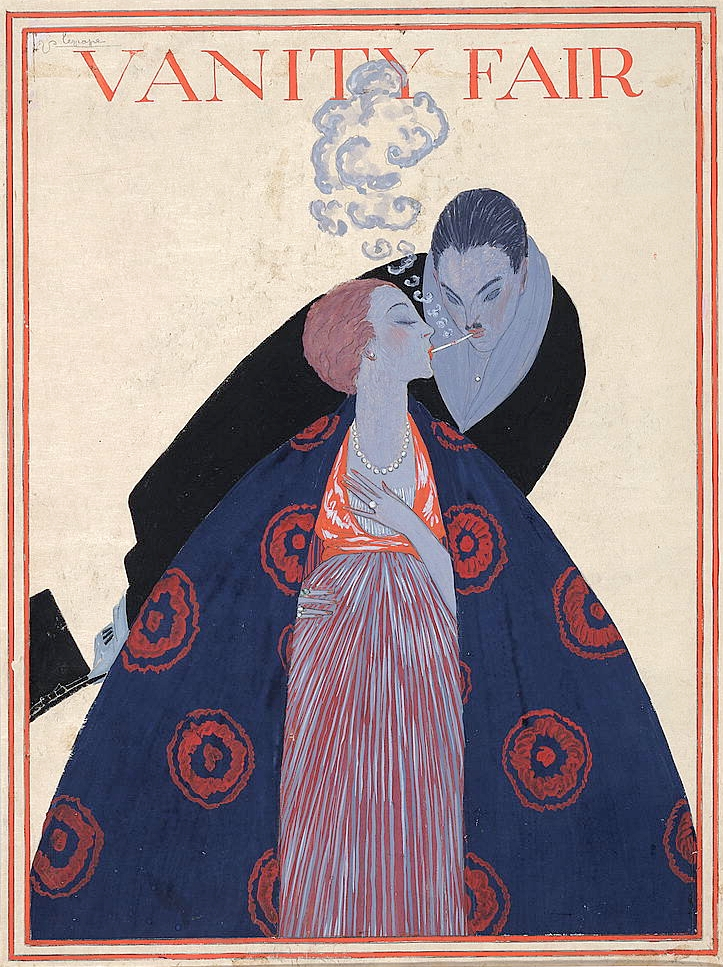
A Vanity Fair cover by Georges Lepape (1919)

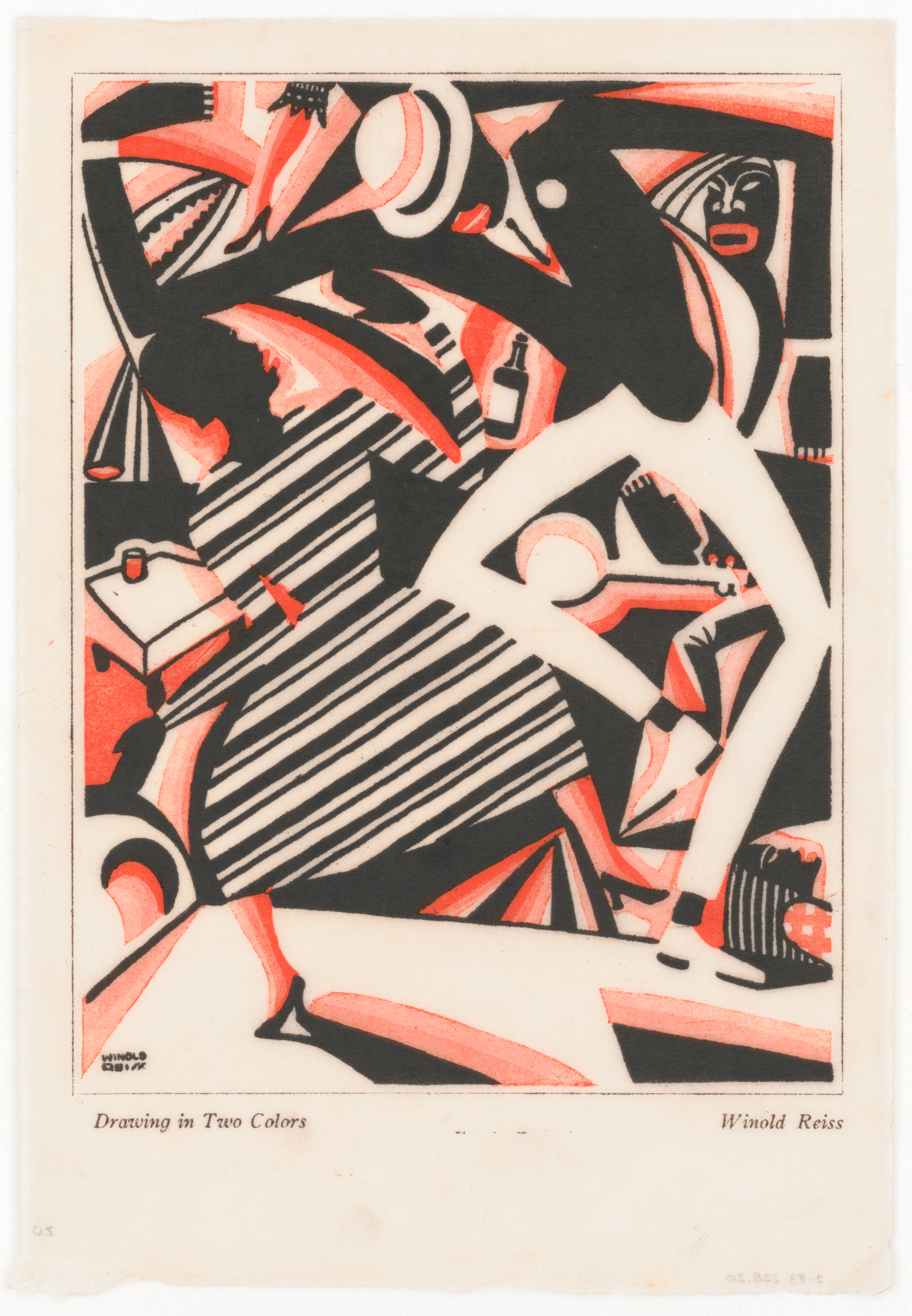
Interpretation of Harlem Jazz I by Winold Reiss (c. 1920)

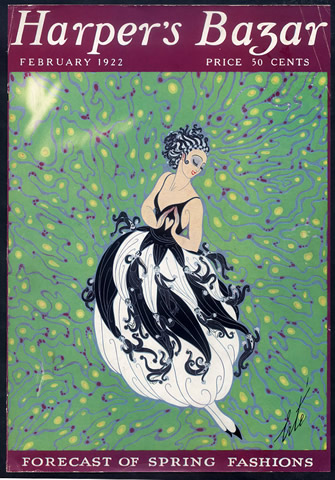
Cover of Harper's Bazaar by Erté (1922)

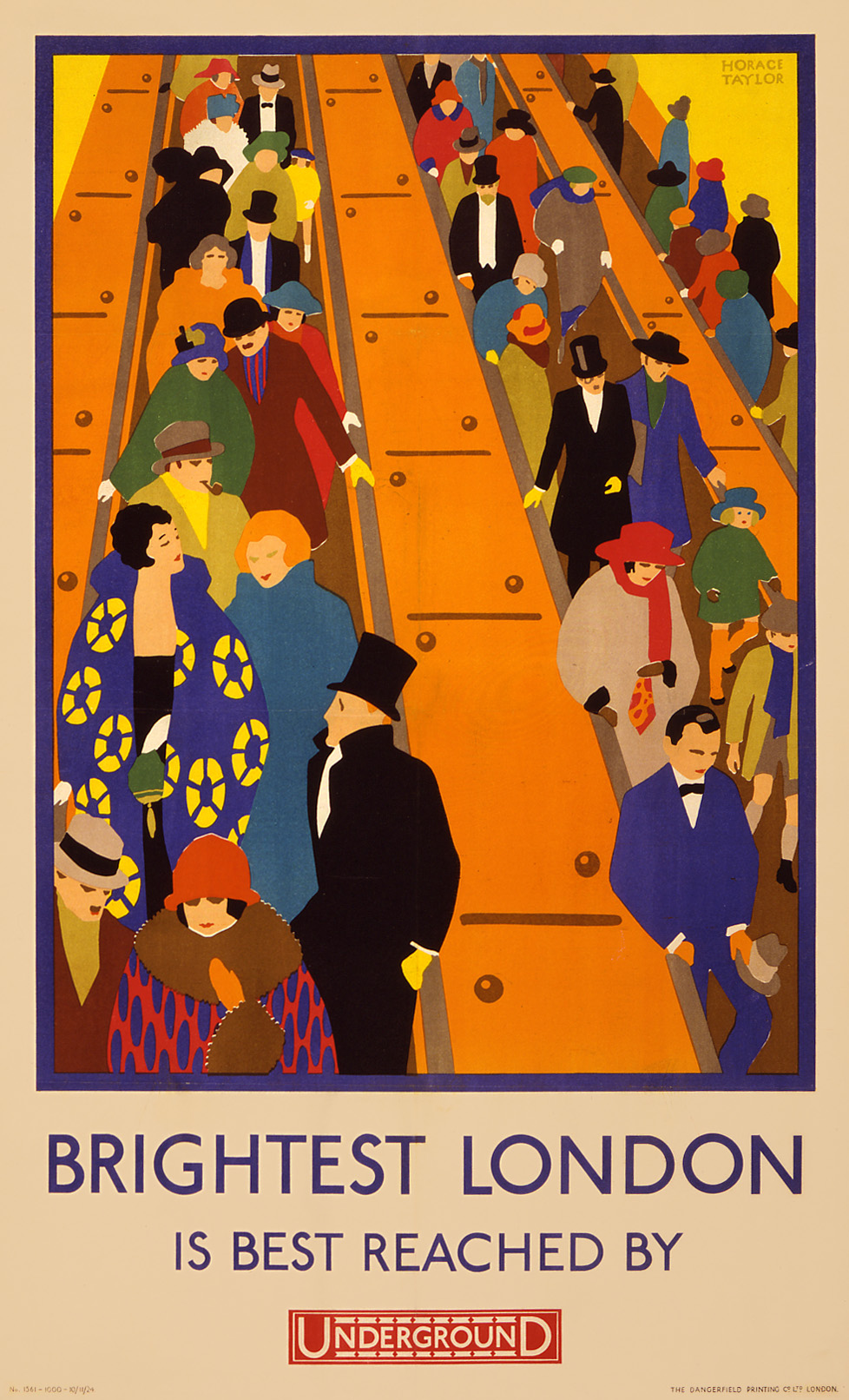
London Underground poster by Horace Taylor (1924)

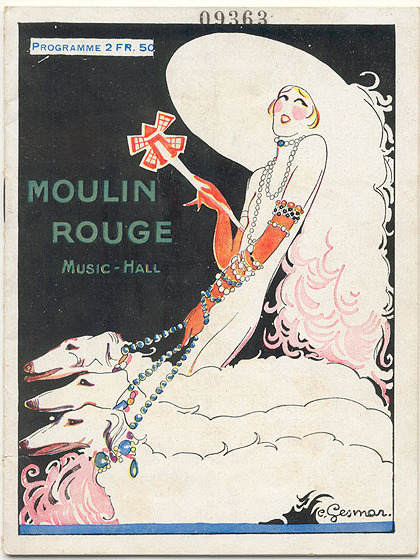
Moulin Rouge poster by Charles Gesmar (1925)

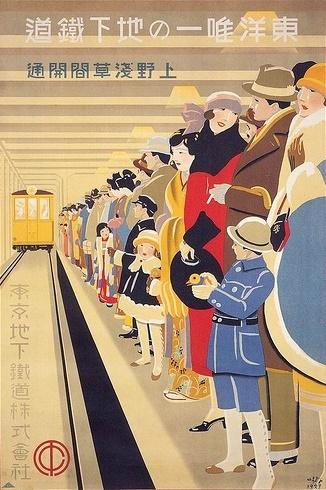
Tokyo Metro poster by Hisui Sugiura (1927)

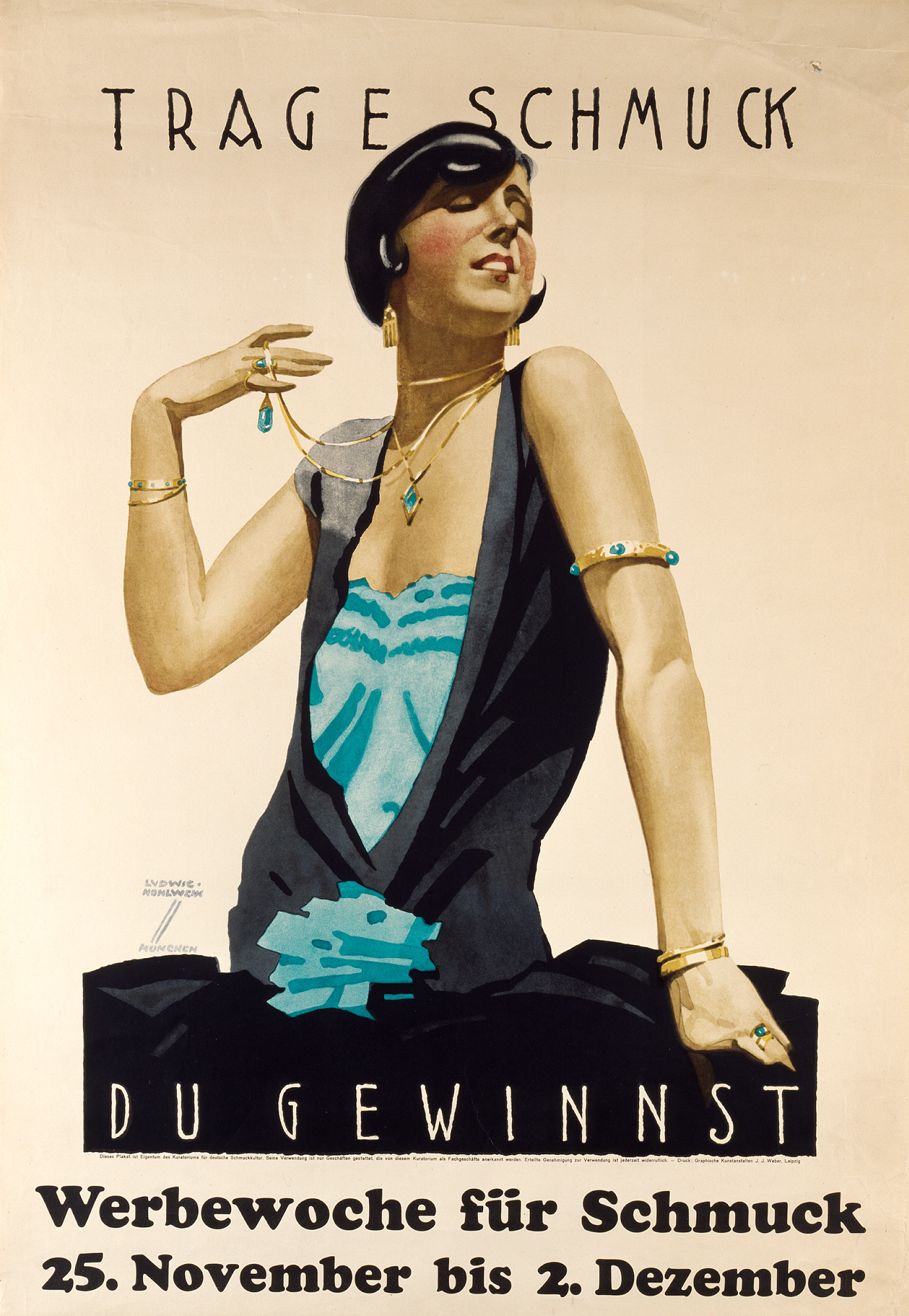
Wear Jewelry - You Win by Ludwig Hohlwein (circa 1930)

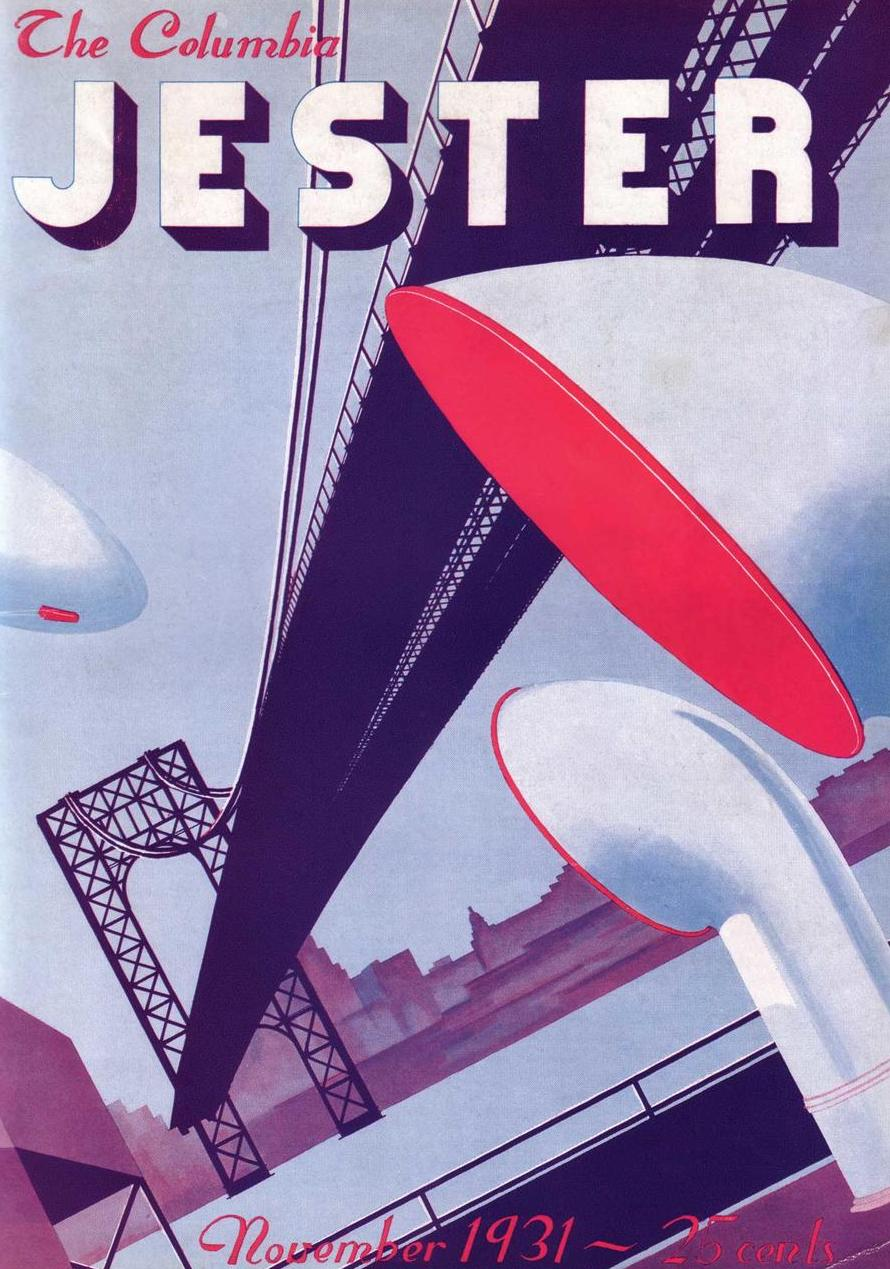
Cover of the Jester of Columbia, unattributed (1931)

The Art Deco style appeared early in the graphic arts, in the years just before World War I. It appeared in Paris in the posters and the costume designs of Léon Bakst for the Ballets Russes, and in the catalogues of the fashion designers Paul Poiret. The illustrations of Georges Barbier, and Georges Lepape and the images in the fashion magazine La Gazette du bon ton perfectly captured the elegance and sensuality of the style. In the 1920s, the look changed; the fashions stressed were more casual, sportive and daring, with the woman models usually smoking cigarettes. American fashion magazines such as Vogue, Vanity Fair and Harper's Bazaar quickly picked up the new style and popularized it in the United States. It also influenced the work of American book illustrators such as Rockwell Kent. In Germany, the most famous poster artist of the period was Ludwig Hohlwein, who created colourful and dramatic posters for music festivals, beers, and, late in his career, for the Nazi Party.

During the Art Nouveau period, posters usually advertised theatrical products or cabarets. In the 1920s, travel posters, made for steamship lines and airlines, became extremely popular. The style changed notably in the 1920s, to focus attention on the product being advertised. The images became simpler, precise, more linear, more dynamic, and were often placed against a single-color background. In France, popular Art Deco designers included Charles Loupot and Paul Colin, who became famous for his posters of American singer and dancer Josephine Baker. Jean Carlu designed posters for Charlie Chaplin movies, soaps, and theatres; in the late 1930s he emigrated to the United States, where, during the World War, he designed posters to encourage war production. The designer Charles Gesmar became famous making posters for the singer Mistinguett and for Air France. Among the best-known French Art Deco poster designers was Cassandre, who made the celebrated poster of the ocean liner SS Normandie in 1935.

In the 1930s a new genre of posters appeared in the United States during the Great Depression. The Federal Art Project hired American artists to create posters to promote tourism and cultural events.

== Decoration and motifs ==
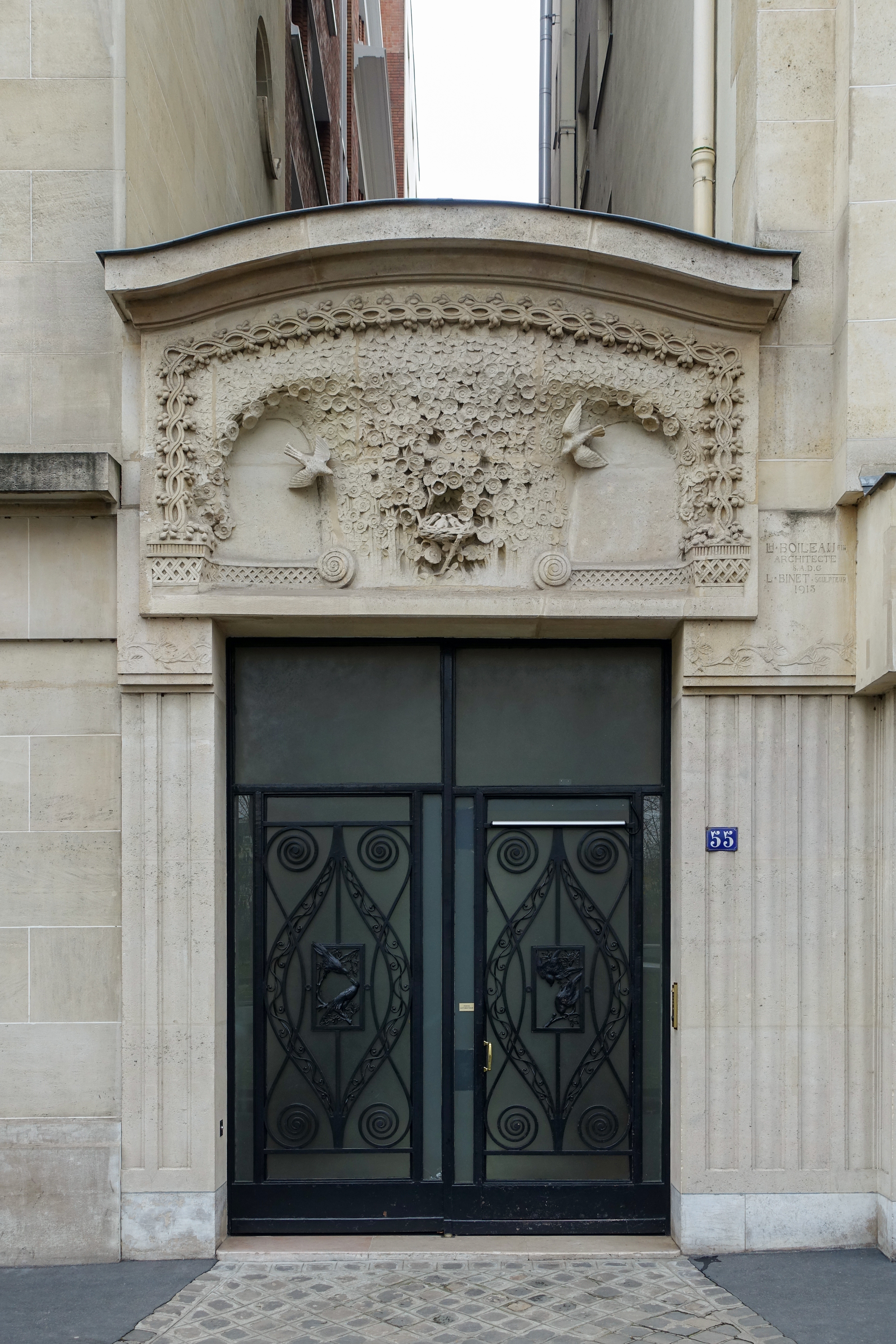
Birds – Quai d'Orsay no. 55 in Paris, designed by Louis-Hippolyte Boileau and carved by Léon Binet (1913)

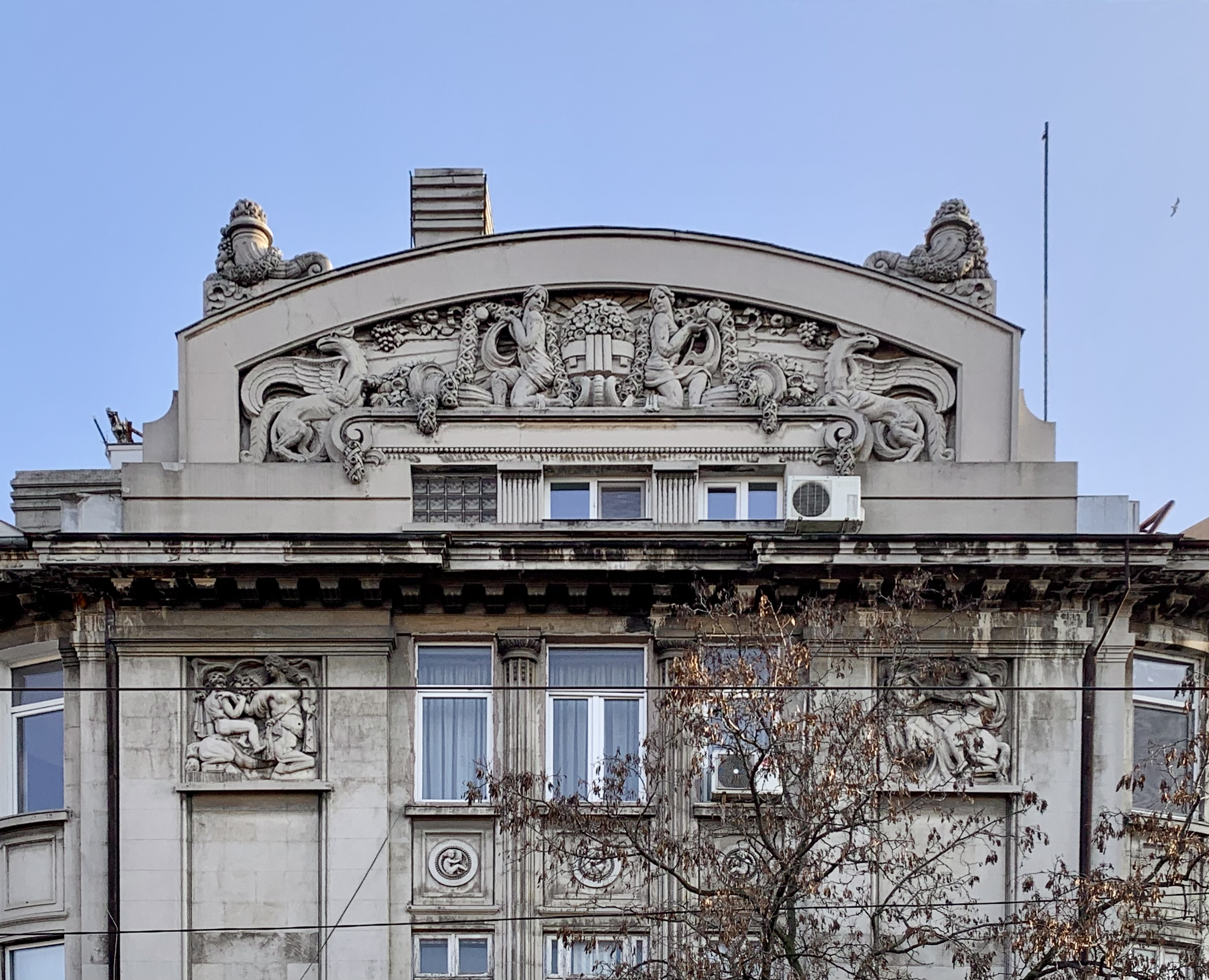
Allegorical representations – Pediment of the Mihai Zisman House (Calea Călărașilor no. 44) in Bucharest, by Soru (1920)

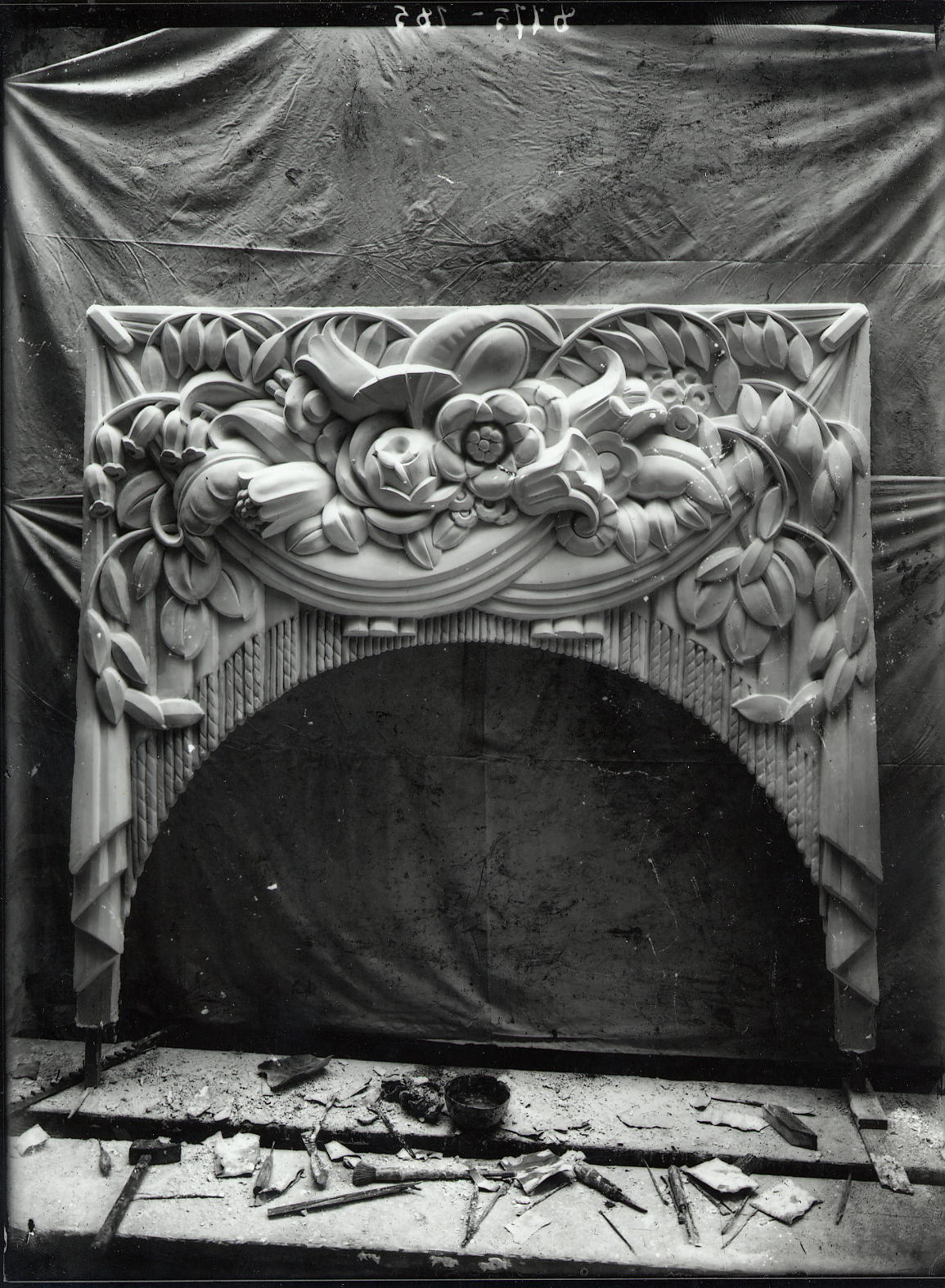
Stylized flowers (especially spiral flowers and converging fascicles) – Architectural element for the Parfumerie d'Orsay in Paris, by Georges Béal (1922)

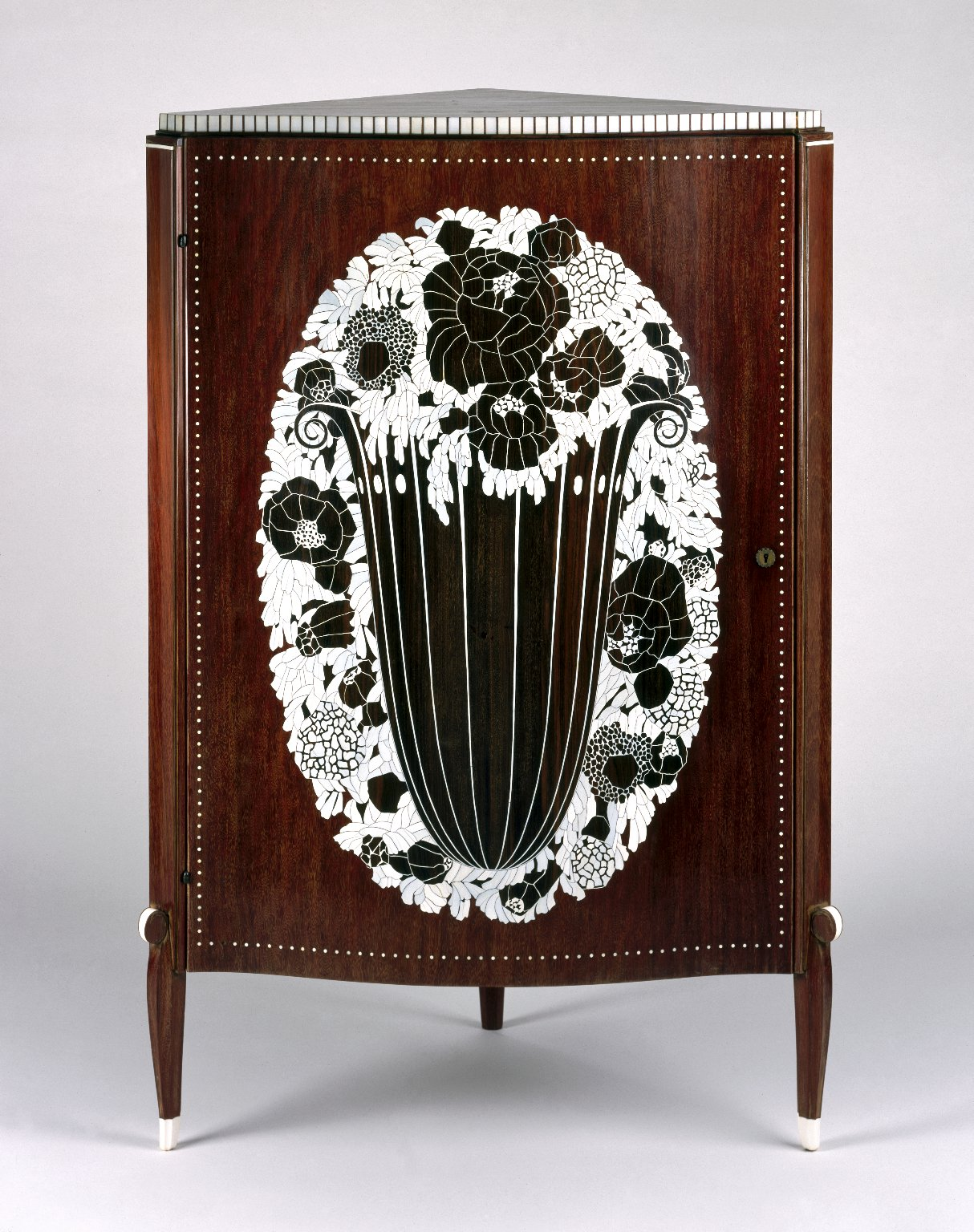
The urn – Corner cabinet made of mahogany with rose basket design of inlaid ivory, by Jacques-Émile Ruhlmann (1923), Brooklyn Museum, New York City

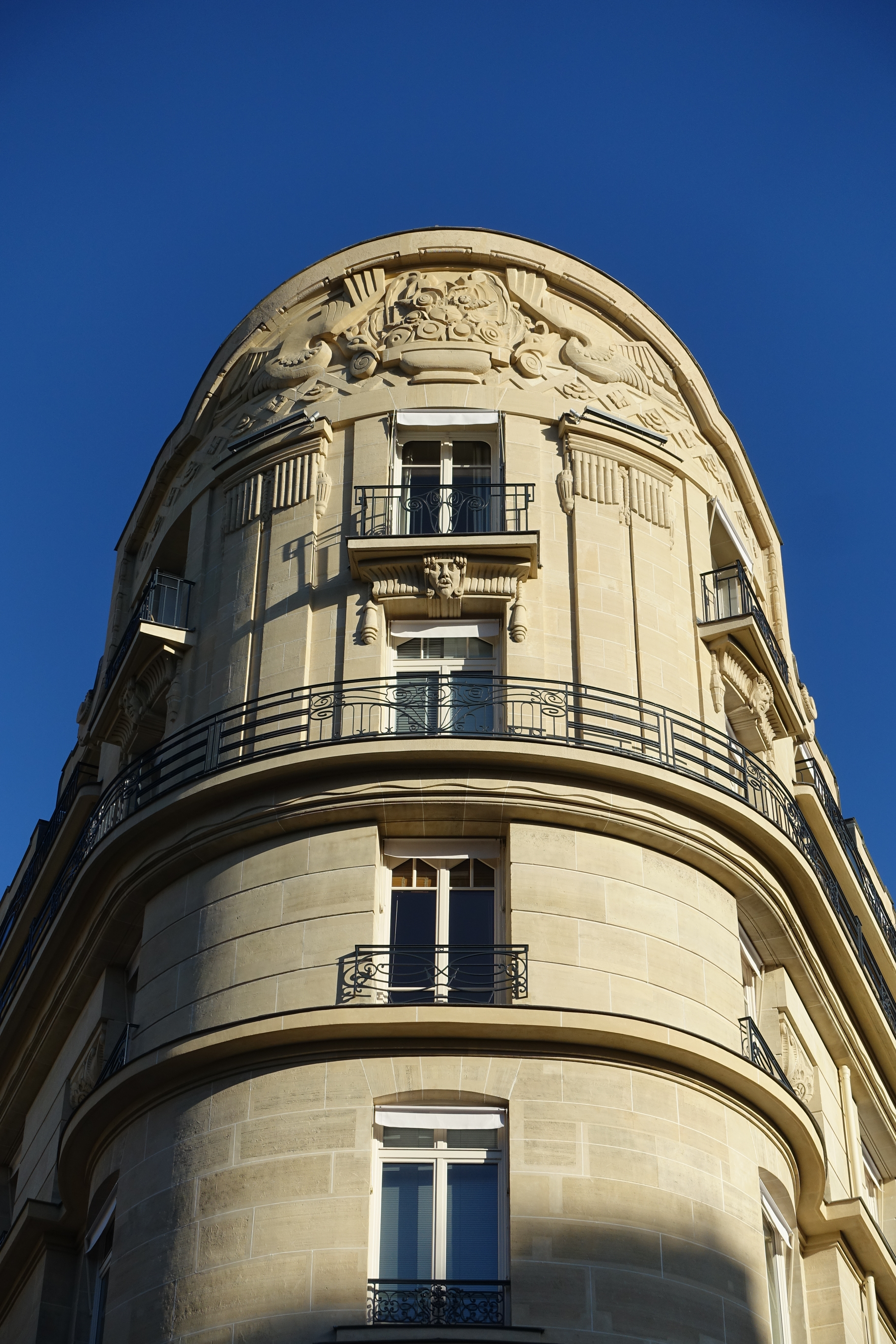
The flower basket – Balconies and pediment of Avenue Montaigne no. 41 in Paris, unknown architect or sculptor (1924)

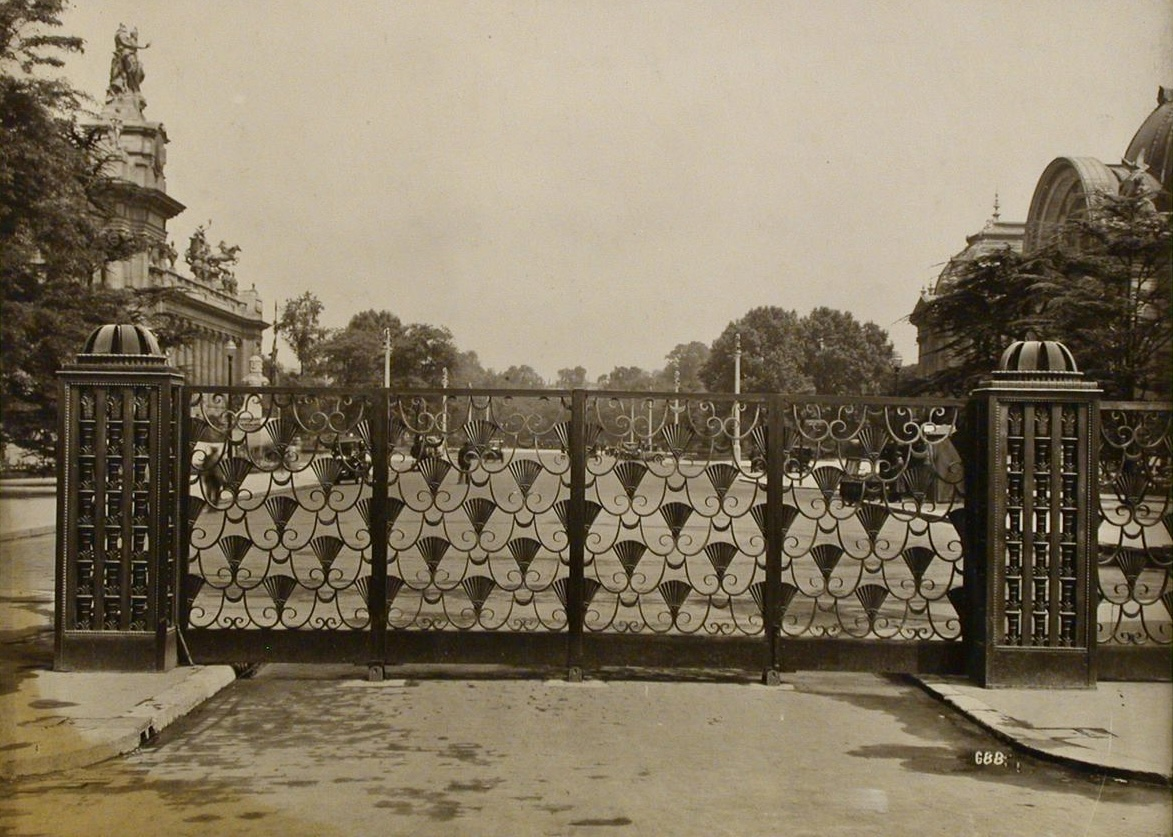
The papyrus flower – Porte d'honneur, at the International Exhibition of Modern Decorative and Industrial Arts in Paris, by Edgar Brandt (1925)

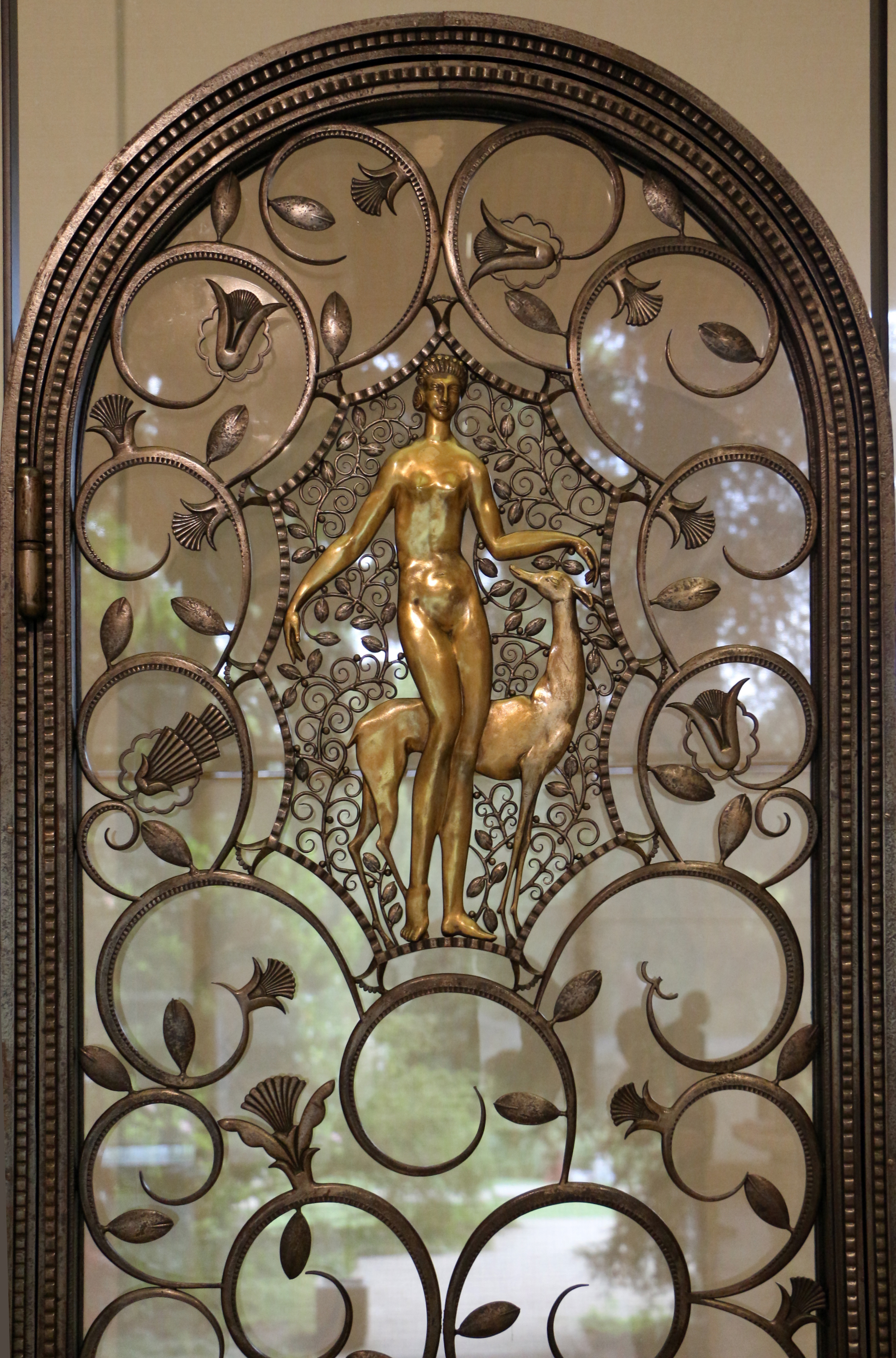
The foliage scroll – Elevator doors, by Brandt (1926), wrought iron, glass, patinated and gilded bronze, Calouste Gulbenkian Museum, Lisbon

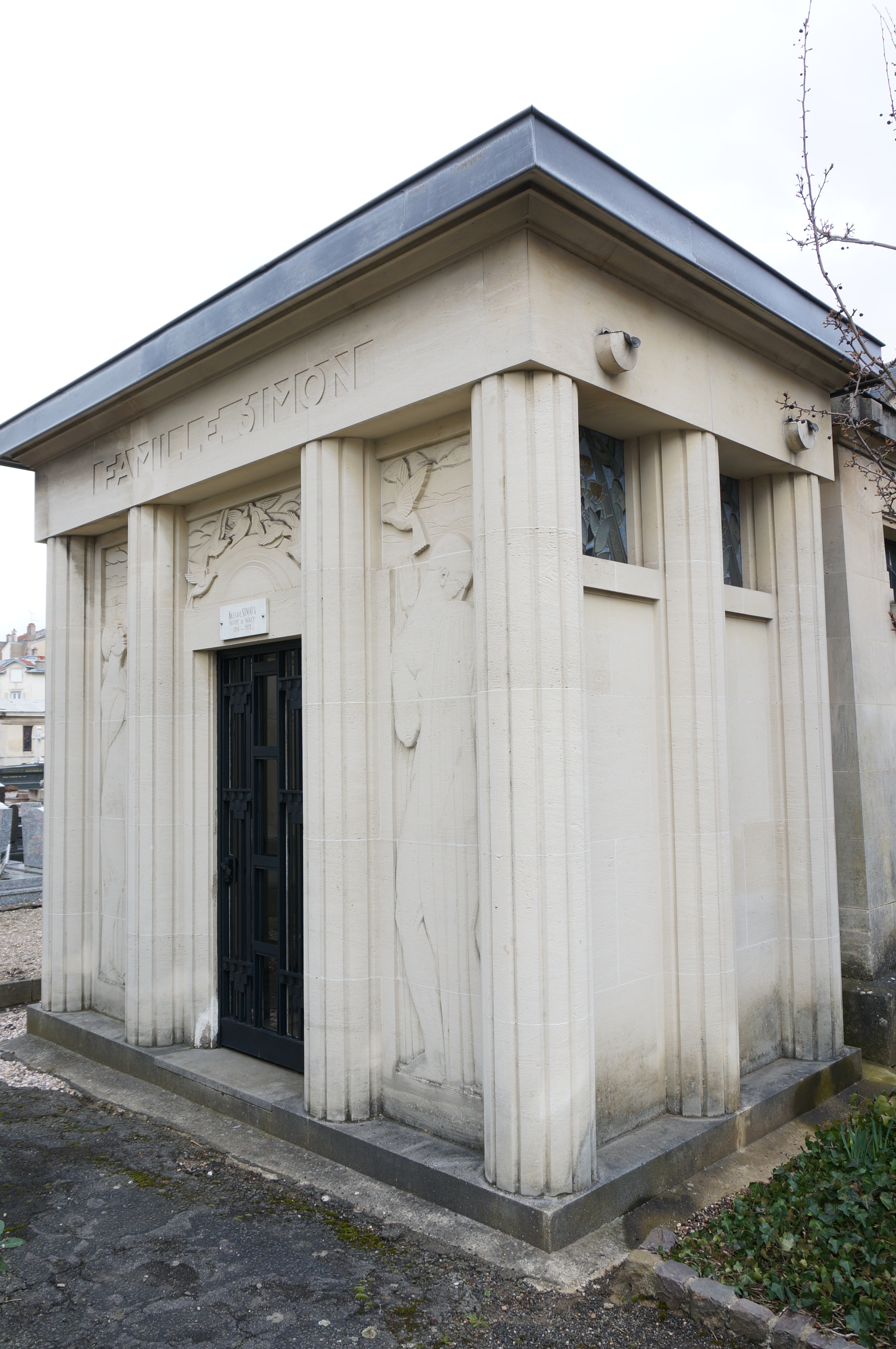
Simplified reinterpretations of the Doric columns (with a basic rectangular capital or base, or just as a shaft) – Grave of Gustave Simon in Préville Cemetery, Nancy, France, unknown architect (after 1926)

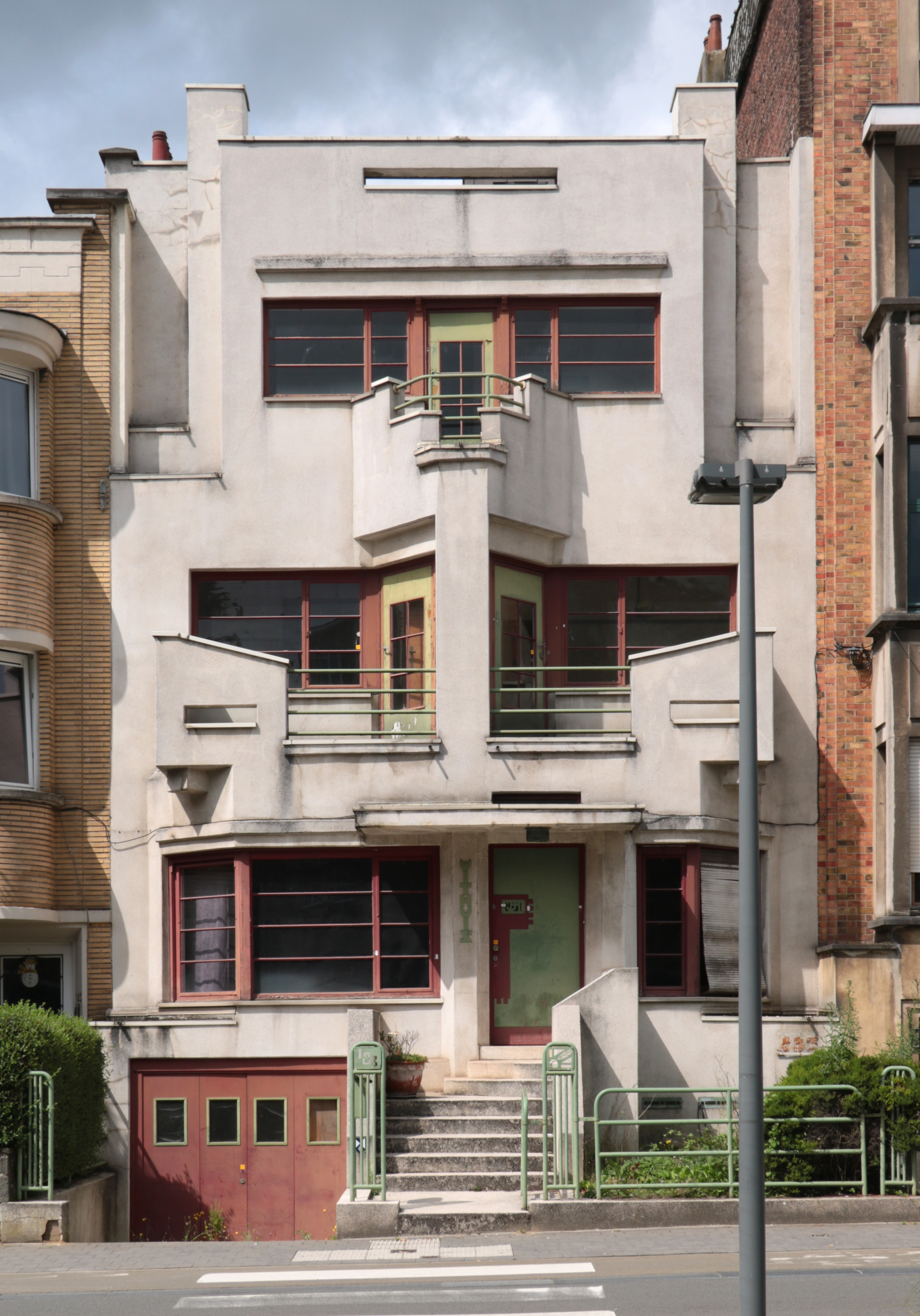
Decoration not just through ornaments, but also through combinations of volumes - Withuis (Avenue Charles Woeste no. 183) in Brussels, Belgium, by Joseph Diongre (1927)

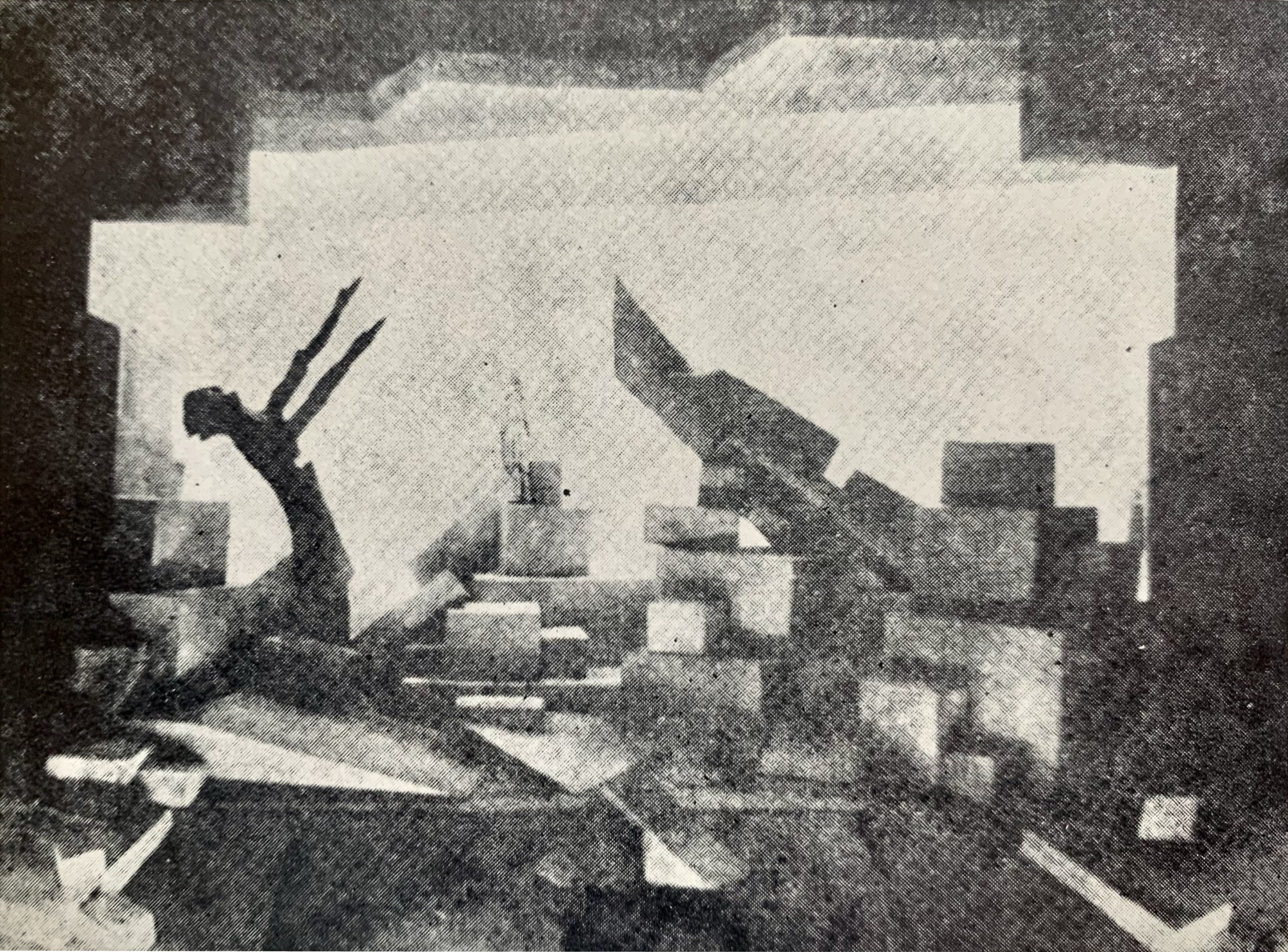
Ingenious games of light and darkness – Stage design for Meșterul Manole (The Master Builder Manole), by Victor Feodorov (1927–28), collection of the National Theatre, Bucharest

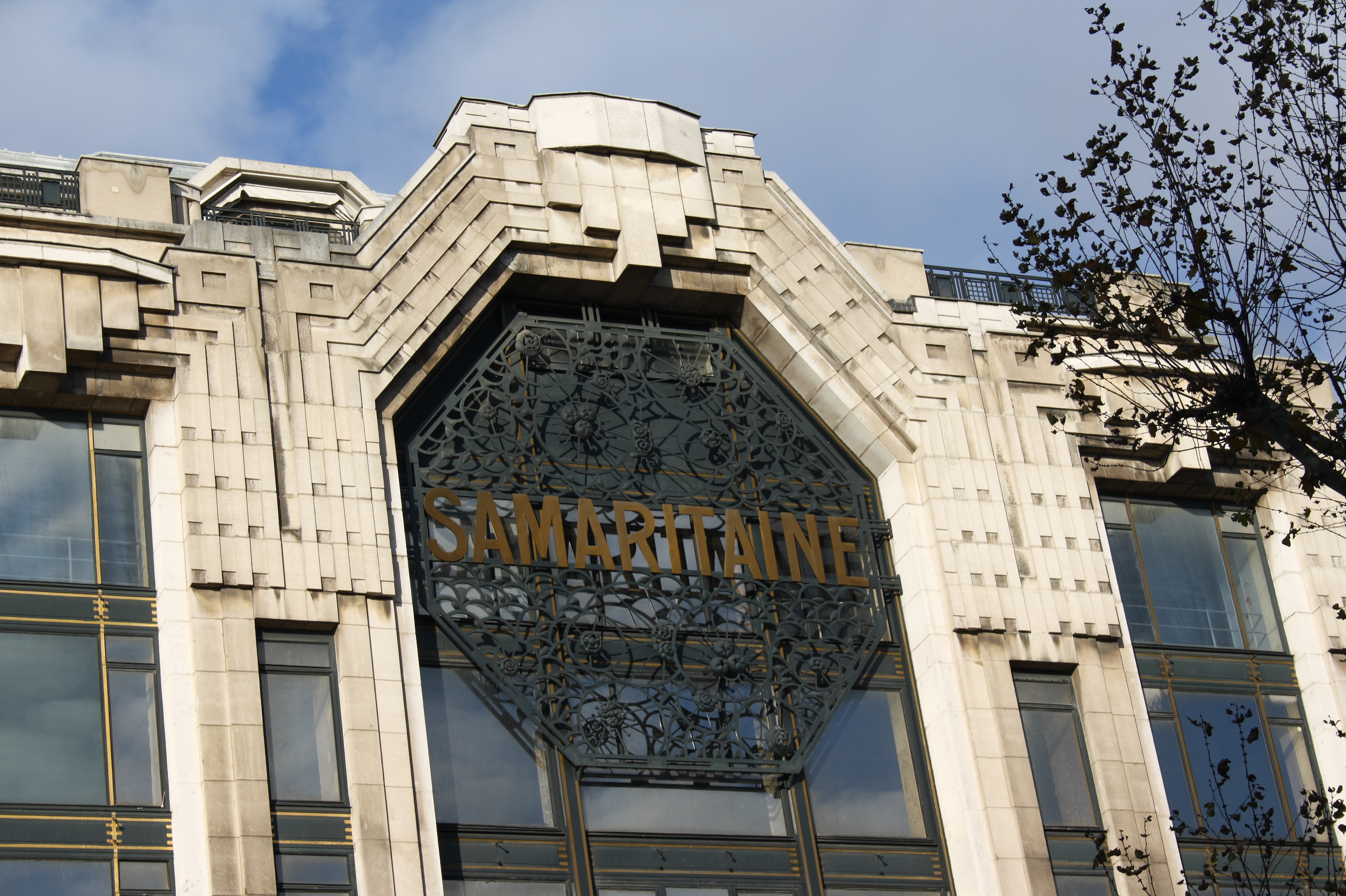
The octagon-shaped medallion – Sign of the La Samaritaine department store in Paris, by Henri Sauvage (1928)

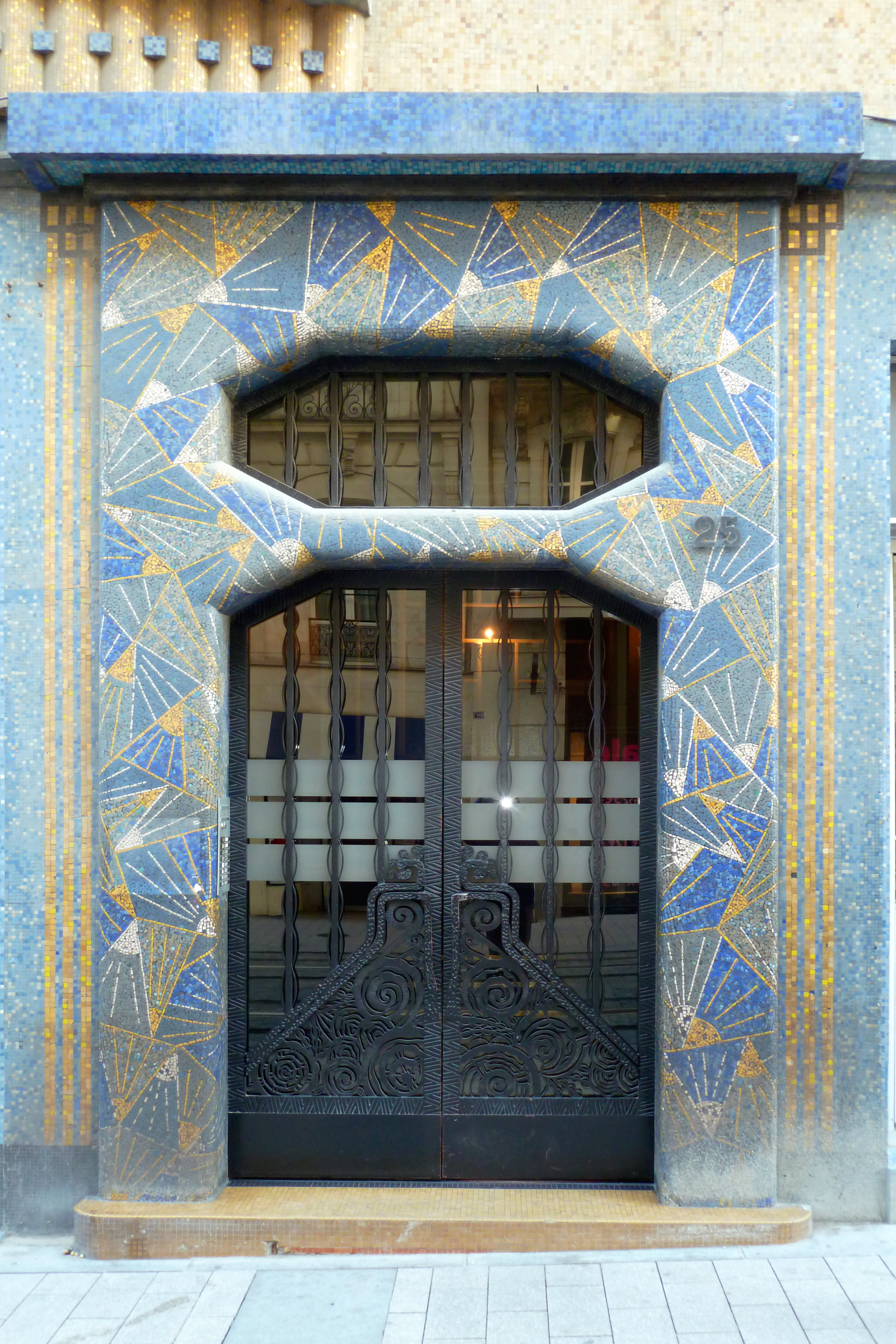
Mosaics – Maison bleue (Rue d'Alsace no. 28) in Angers, France, designed by Roger Jusserand, and decorated with mosaics by the Odorico fréres (1928)

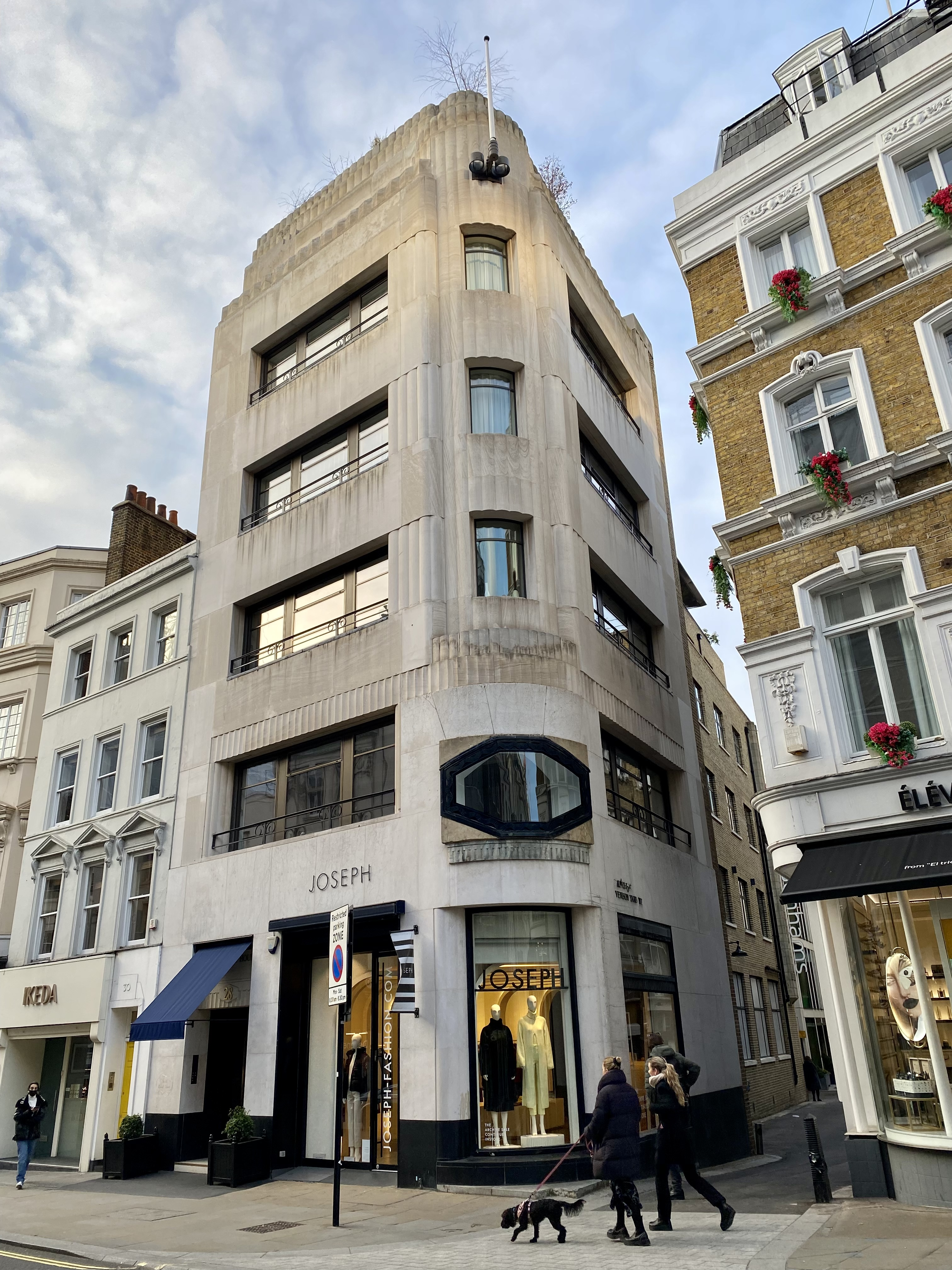
Vertical mouldings – Greybrook House (Brook Street no. 28) in London, by Sir John Burnet & Partners (1928–29)

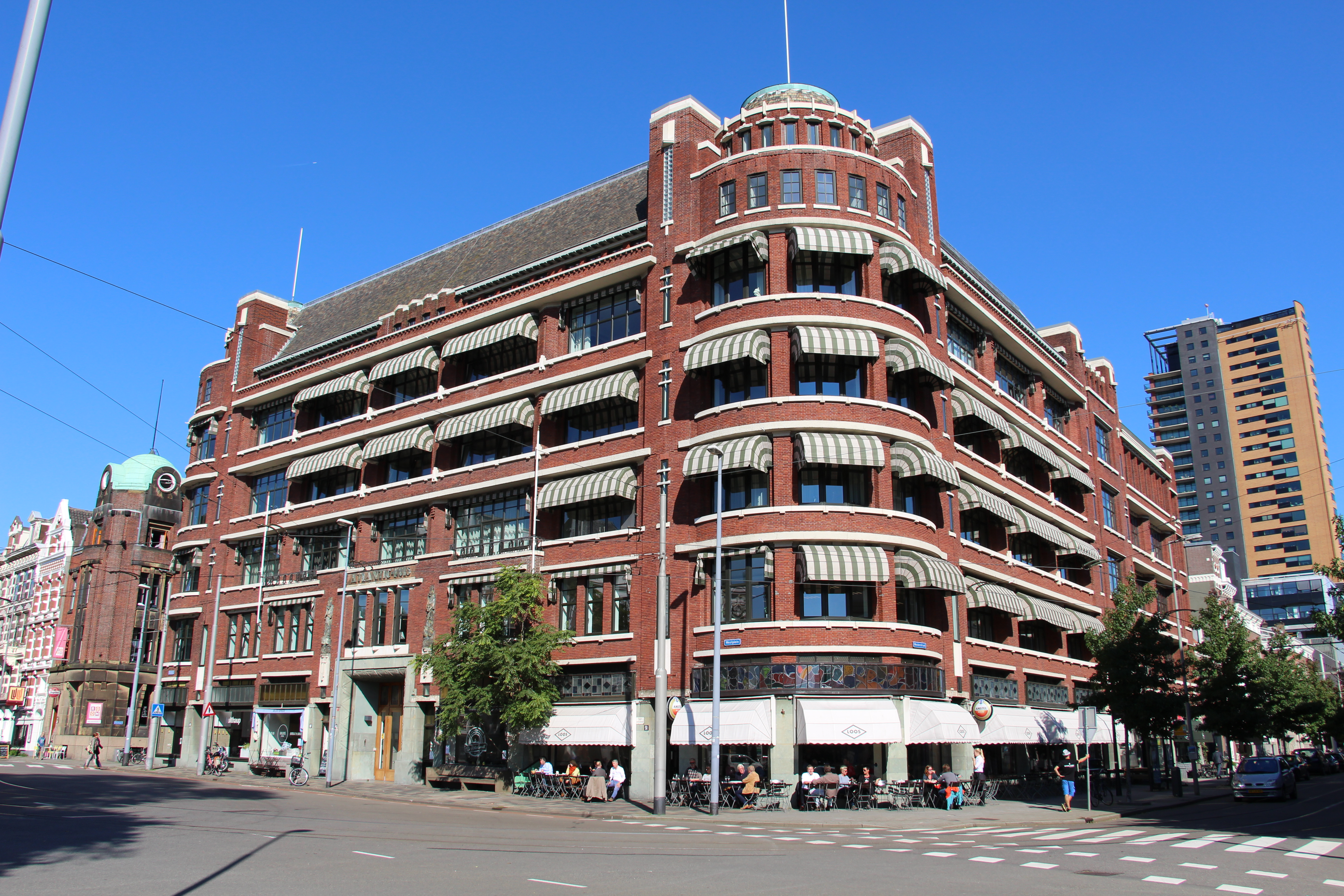
Horizontal mouldings – Atlantic Huis (Westplein no. 51) in Rotterdam, by P.G. Buskens (1928–1930)

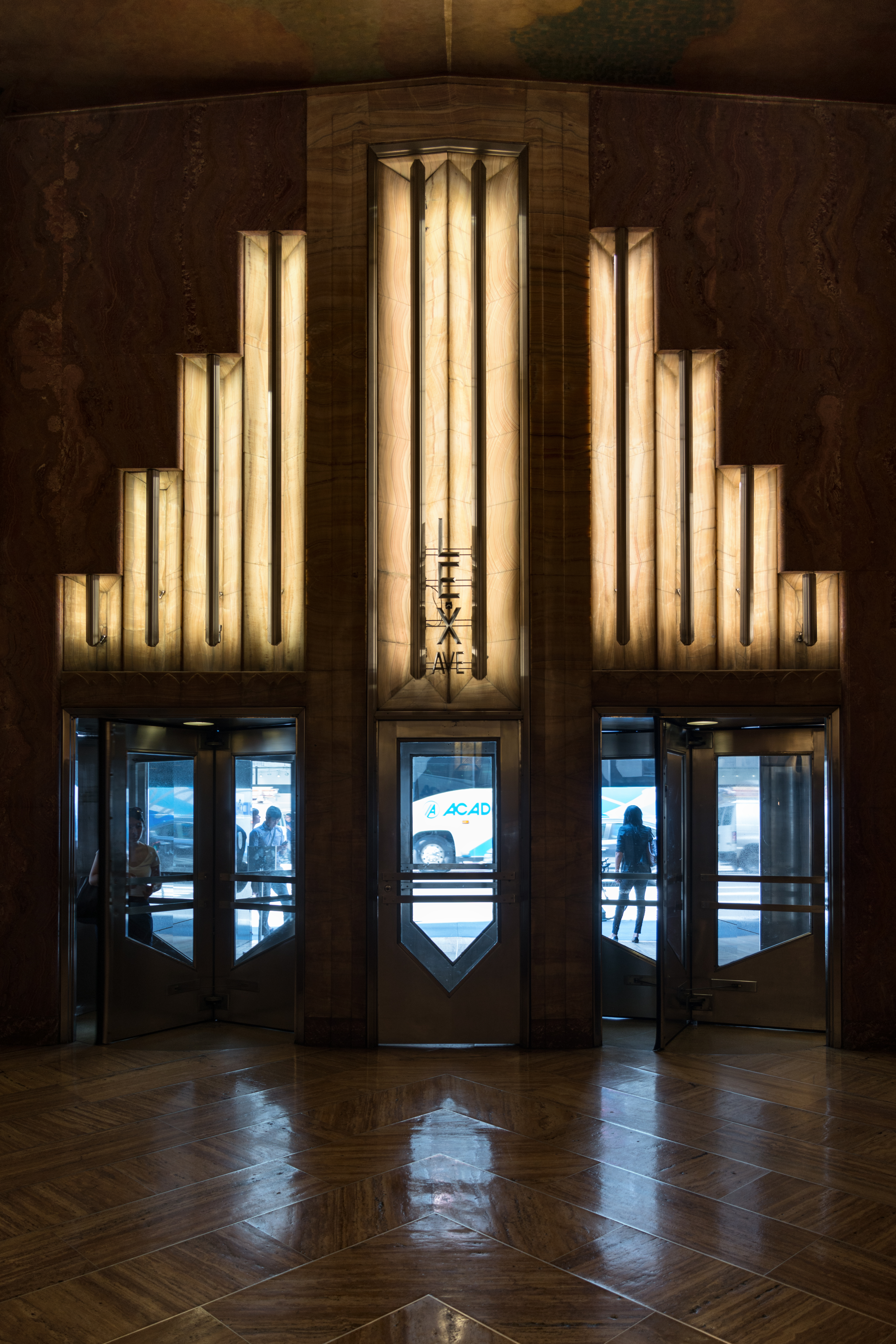
The stepped motif – Entrance hall of the Chrysler Building in New York City, by William Van Allen (1928–1930)

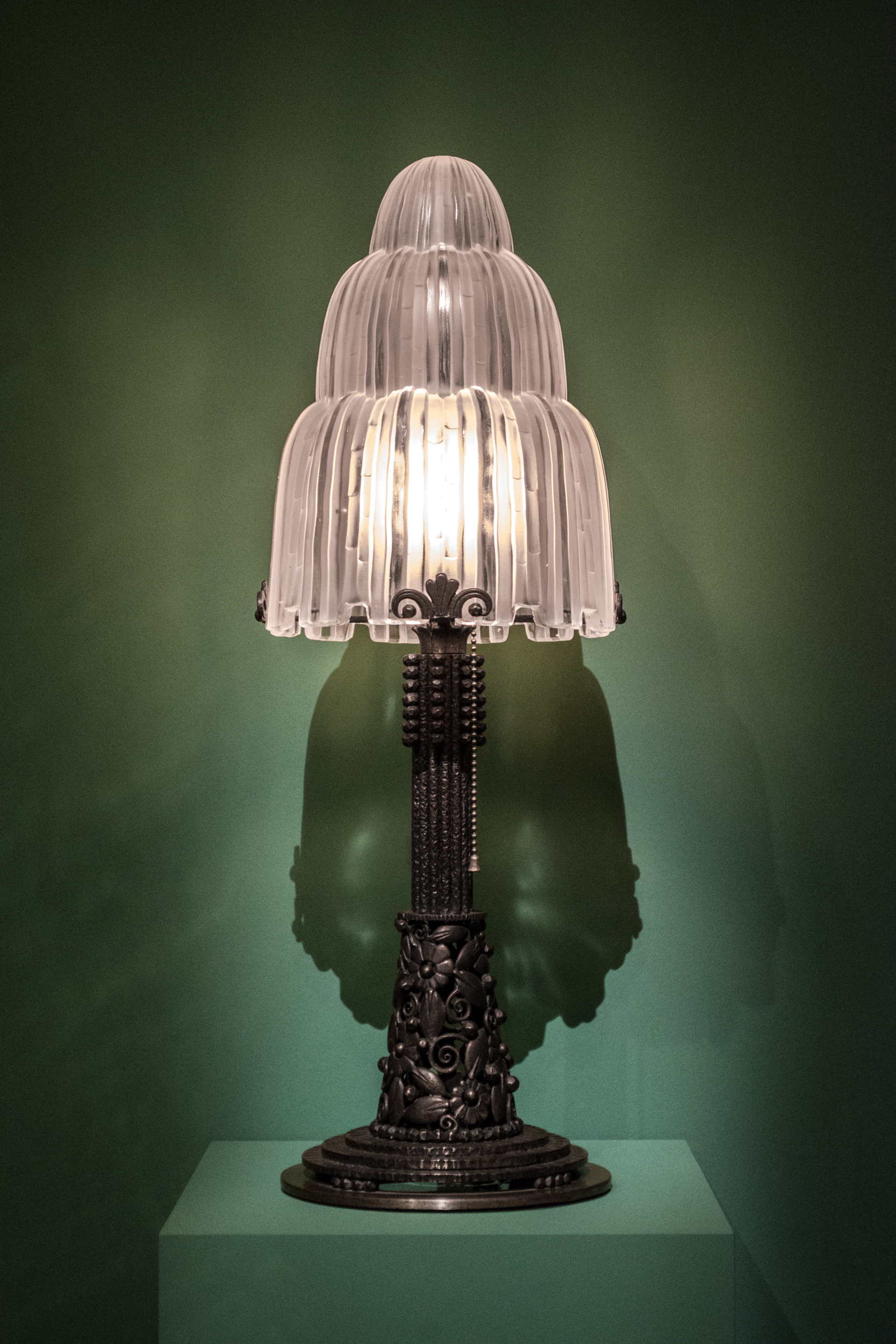
The artesian fountain – Lamp, by Paul Kiss (c. 1930), glass and metal, in a temporary exhibition called the "Jazz Age" at the Cleveland Museum of Art, US

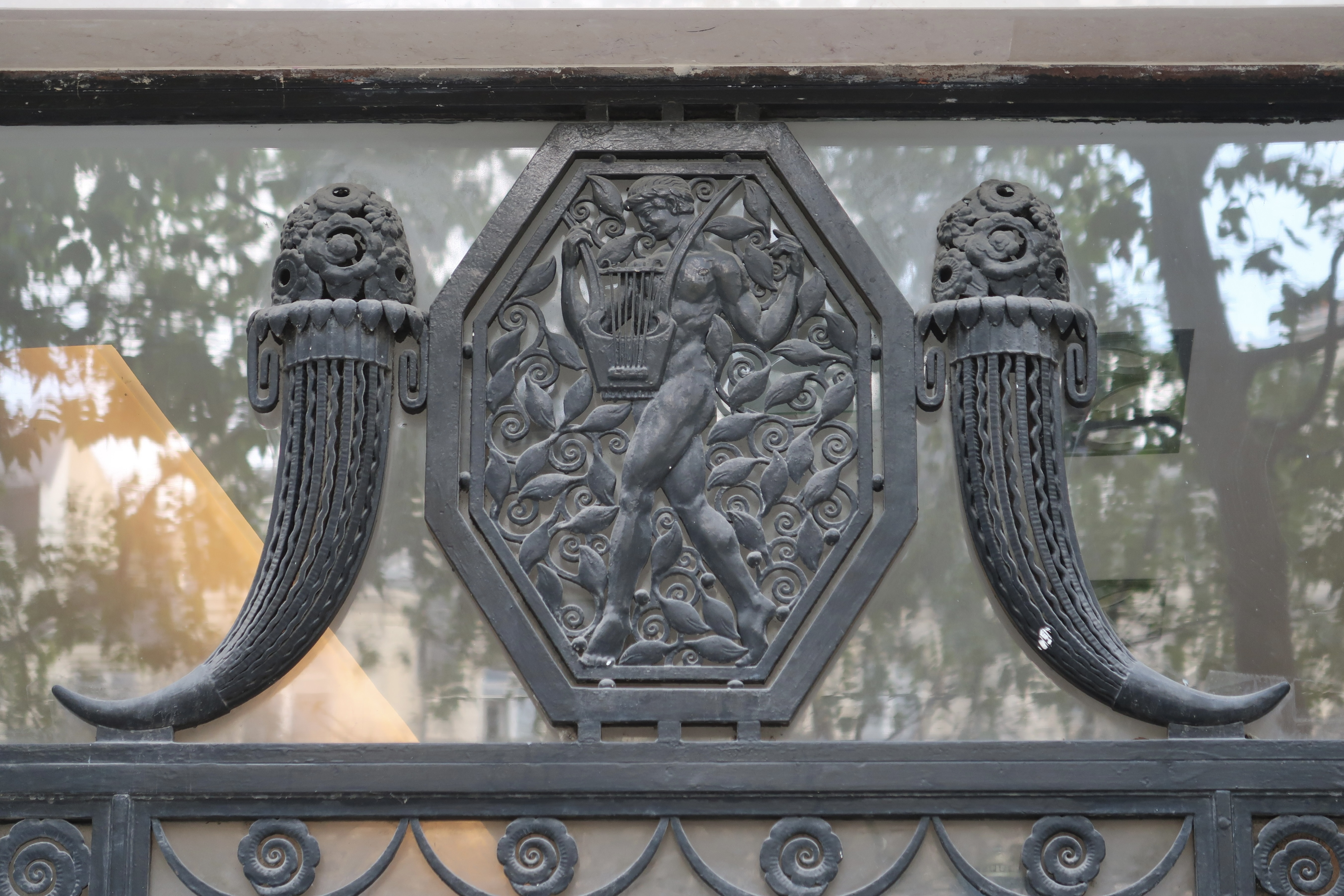
The cornucopia – Avenue des Champs-Élysées no. 77 in Paris, unknown architect (c. 1930)

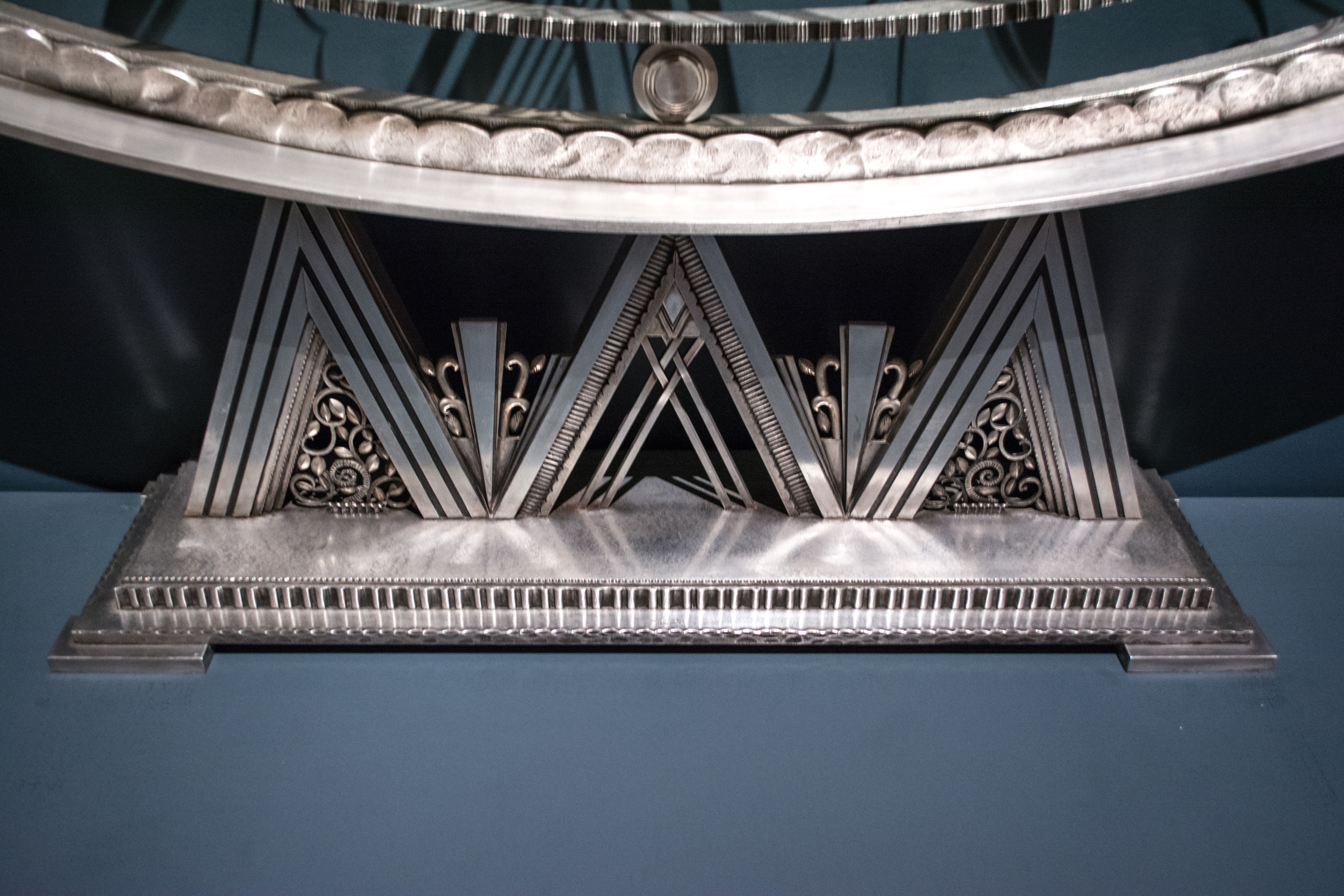
Complex zigzags – Foot of a console table, by Paul Fehér (c. 1930), metal, in a temporary exhibition called the "Jazz Age" at the Cleveland Museum of Art

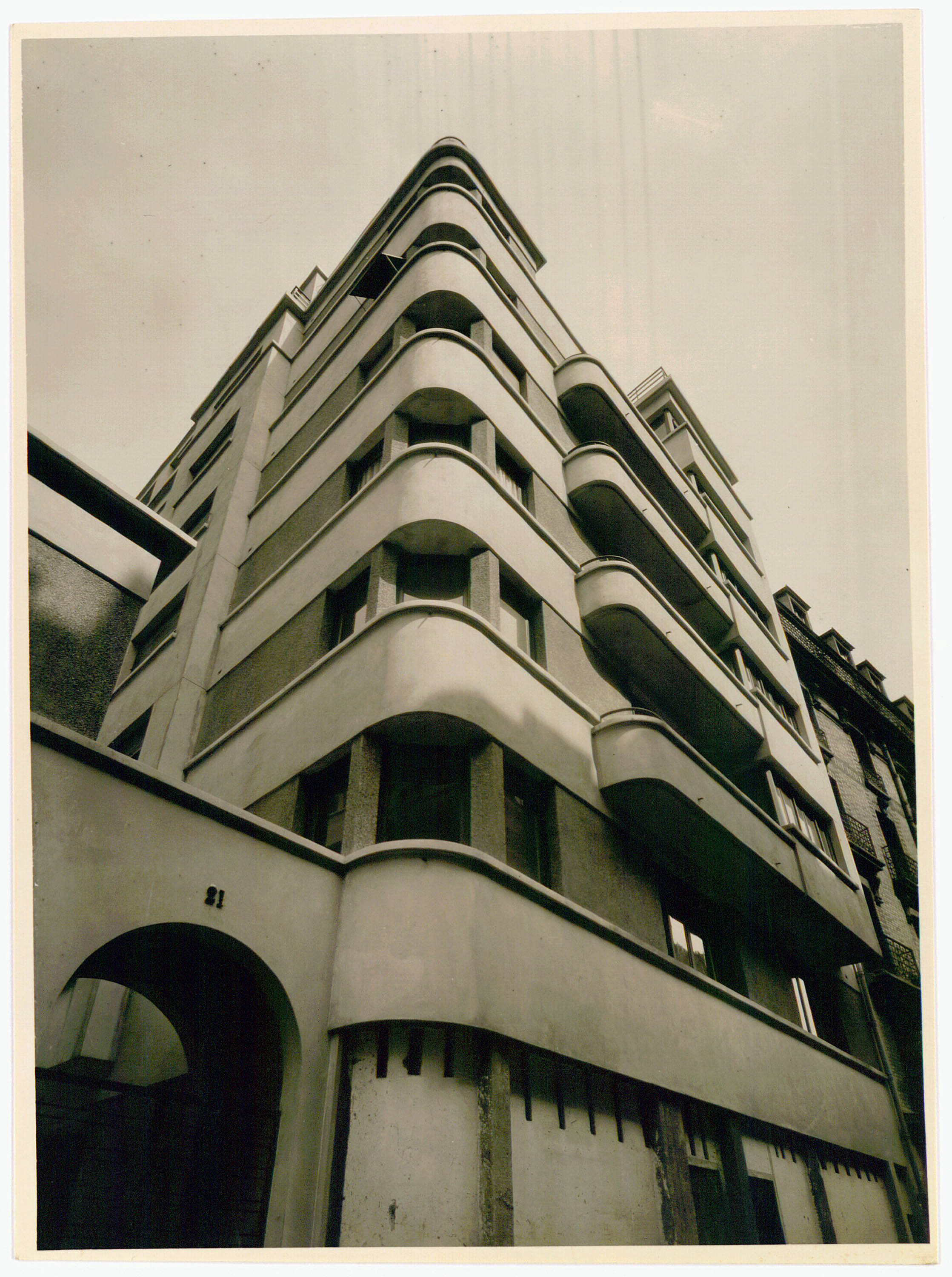
Streamlining – Rue Gramme no. 17–21 in Paris, by Marcel Chappey (1930)

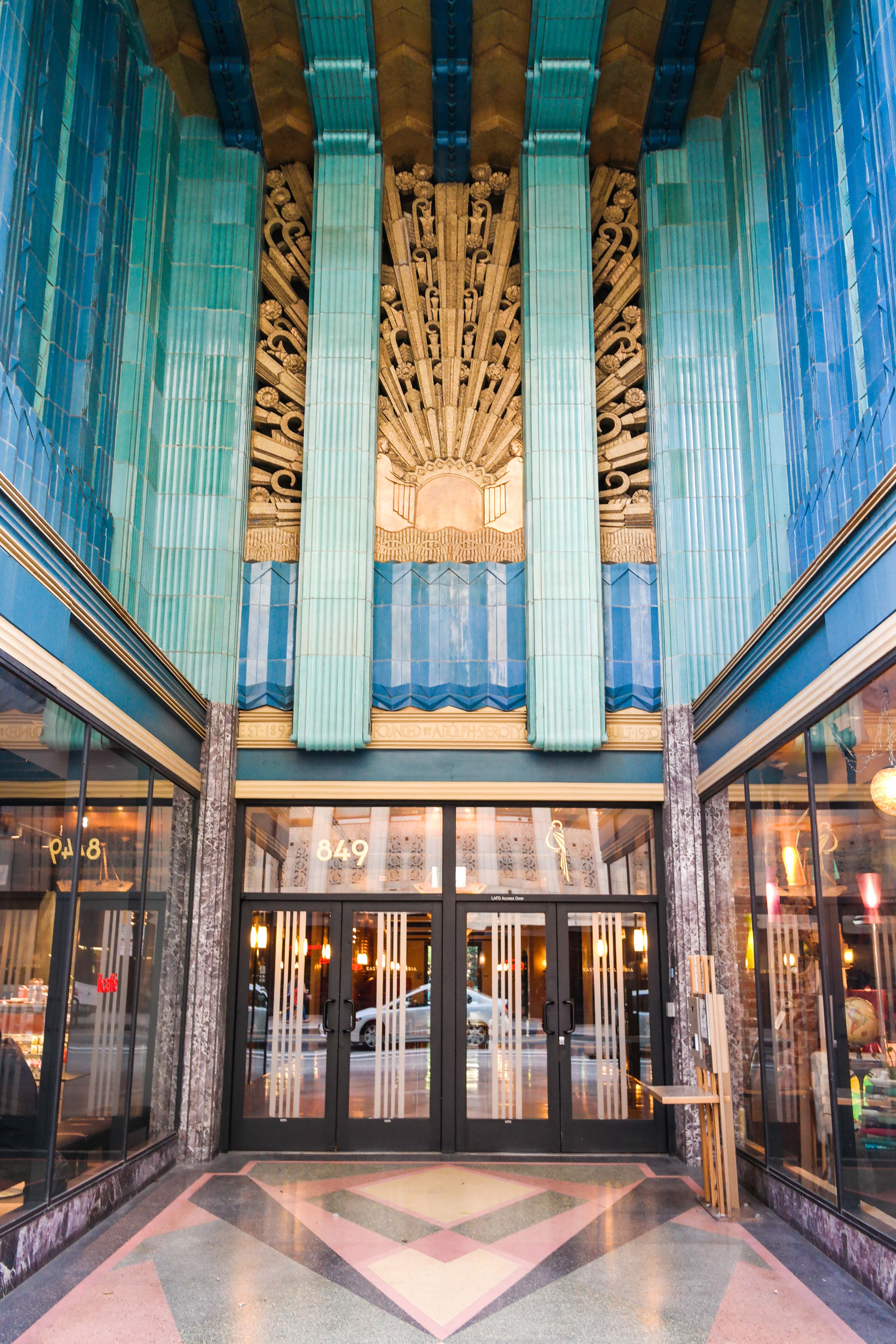
The sunburst – Detail above the entrance of the Eastern Columbia Building (S. Broadway no. 849) in L.A., by Claud Beelman (1930)

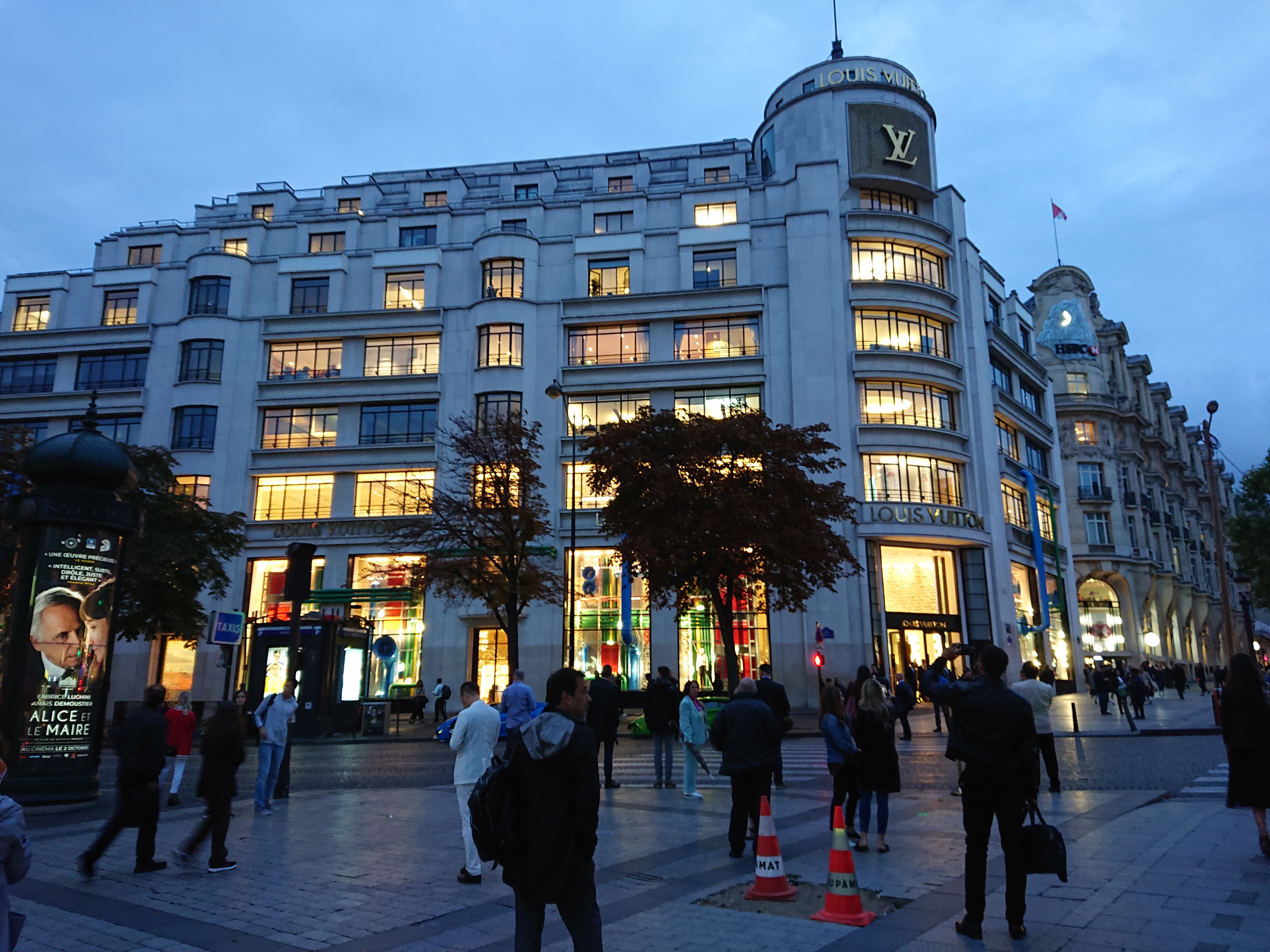
An aesthetic of artificial lighting – Maison de France (now showroom for Louis Vuitton), Avenue des Champs-Élysées no. 101 in Paris, by Louis-Hippolyte Boileau and Charles-Henri Besnard (1931)

Ziggurat – Union Hotel (Strada Ion Câmpineanu no. 11) in Bucharest, by Arghir Culina (1931)

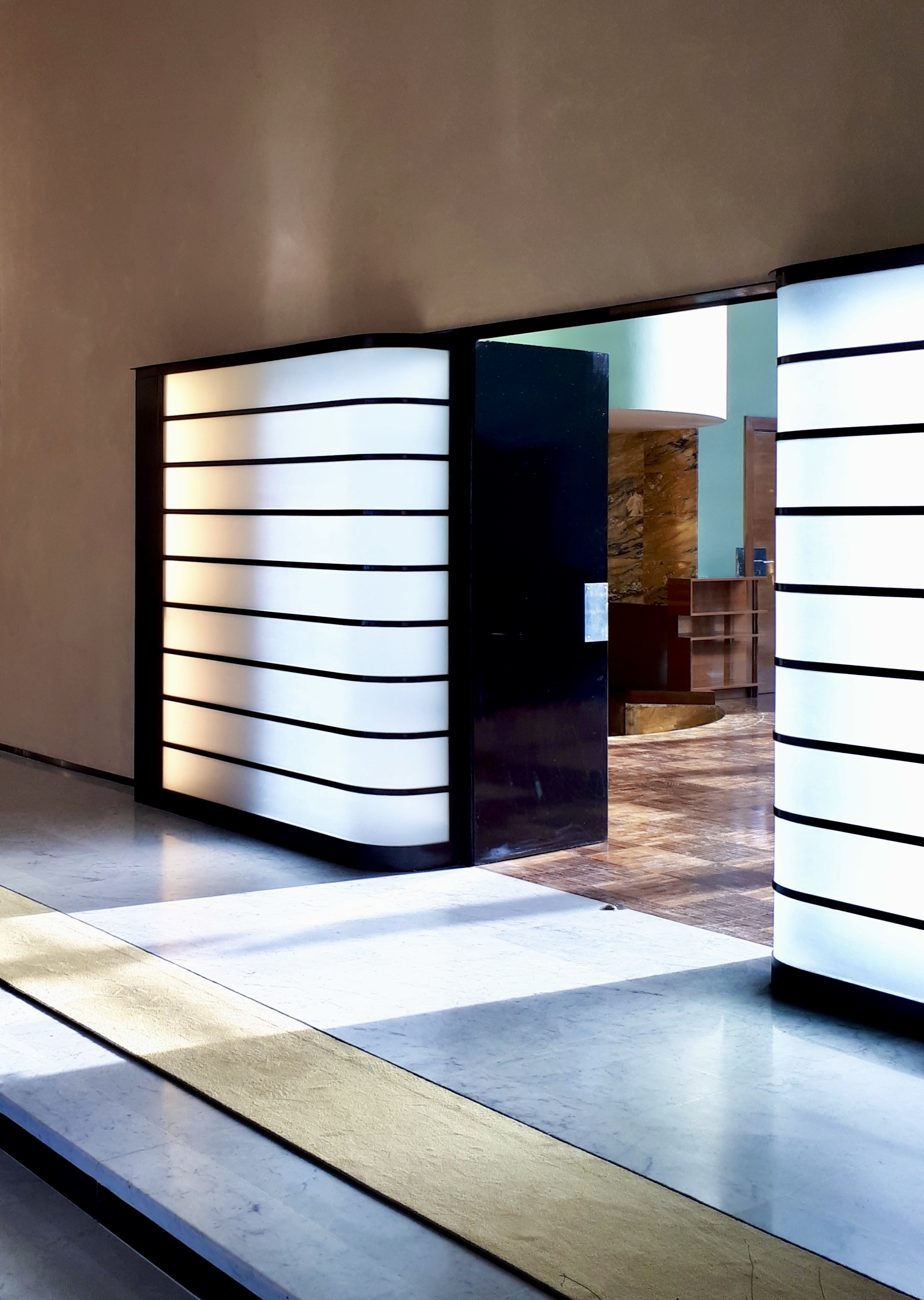
Vertical and horizontal luminous surfaces – Entrance hall of the Villa Cavrois in Croix, France, by Rob Mallet-Stevens (1932)

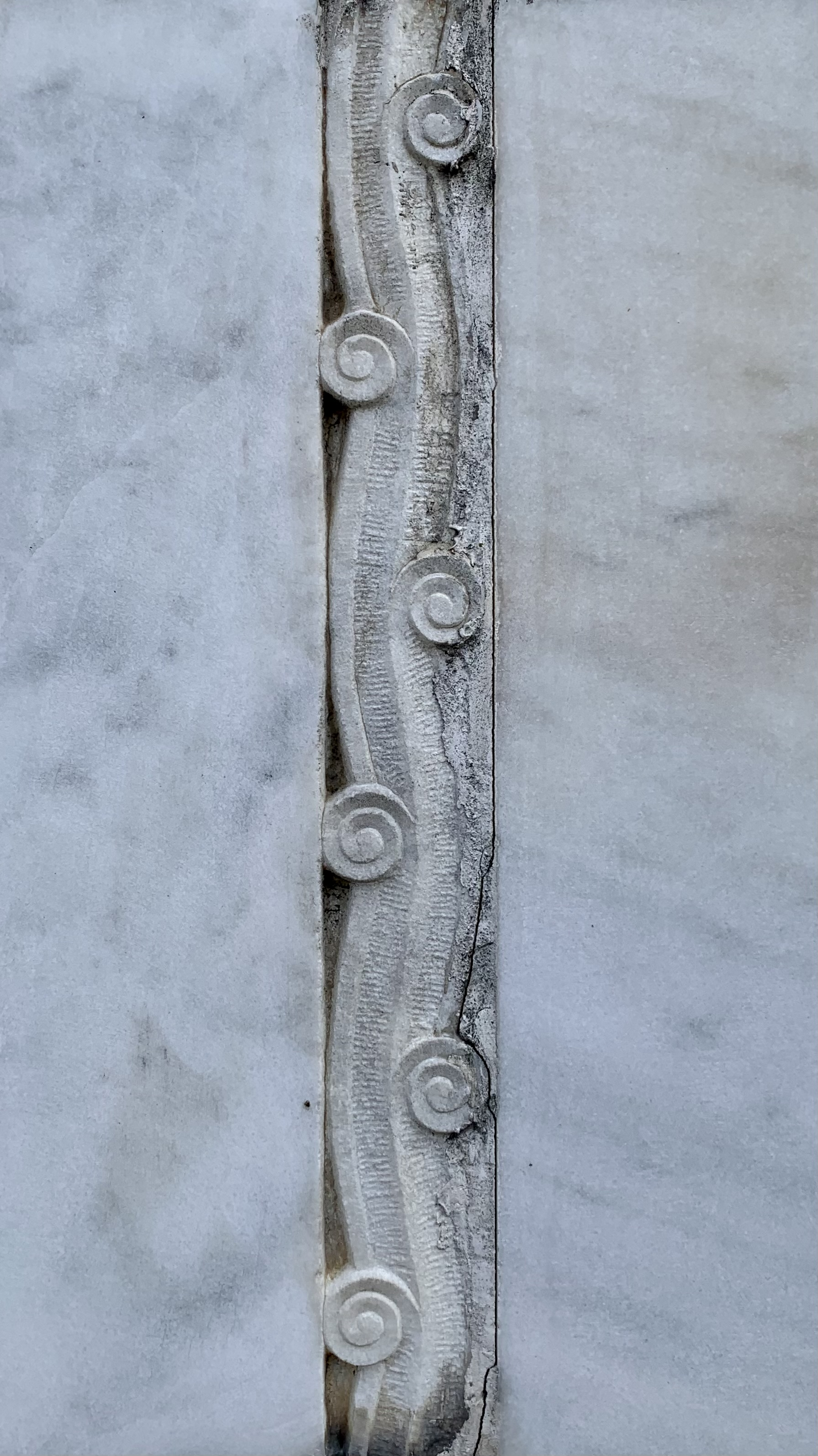
The undulating line – Relief on the Grave of the Străjescu Family in Bellu Cemetery, Bucharest, by George Cristinel (1934)

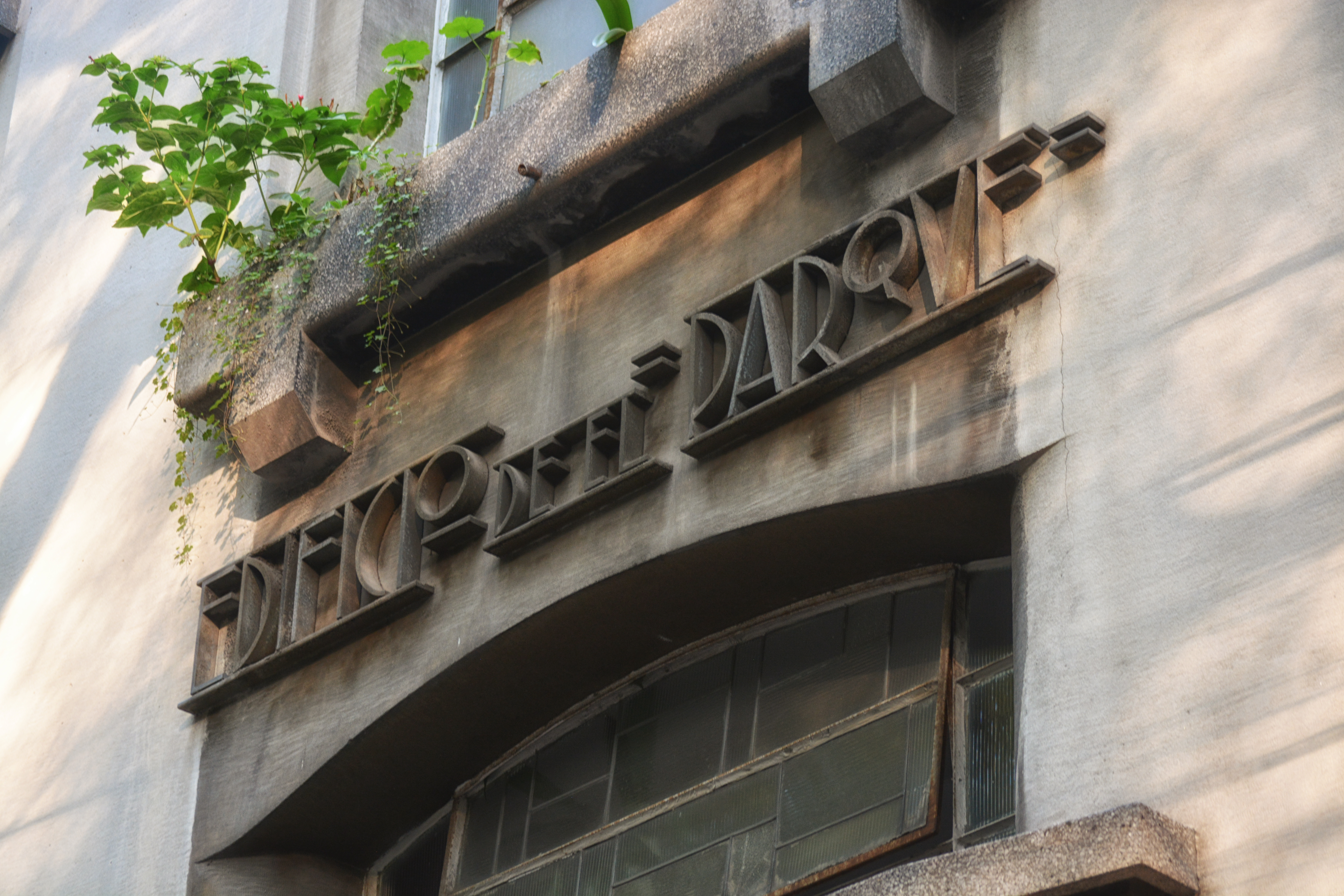
Decorative stylized lettering – Edificio del Parque in Mexico City, by Ernesto Buenrostro (1935)

Philippines flag inspired inscription in a mansion in Libmanan, Camarines Sur, Philippines

Decoration in the Art Deco period went through several distinct phases. Between 1910 and 1920, as Art Nouveau was exhausted, design styles saw a return to tradition, particularly in the work of Paul Iribe. In 1912 André Vera published an essay in the magazine L'Art Décoratif calling for a return to the craftsmanship and materials of earlier centuries and using a new repertoire of forms taken from nature, particularly baskets and garlands of fruit and flowers. A second tendency of Art Deco, also from 1910 to 1920, was inspired by the bright colours of the artistic movement known as the Fauves and by the colourful costumes and sets of the Ballets Russes. This style was often expressed with exotic materials such as sharkskin, mother of pearl, ivory, tinted leather, lacquered and painted wood, and decorative inlays on furniture that emphasized its geometry. This period of the style reached its high point in the 1925 Paris Exposition of Decorative Arts. In the late 1920s and the 1930s, the decorative style changed, inspired by new materials and technologies. It became sleeker and less ornamental. Furniture, like architecture, began to have rounded edges and to take on a polished, streamlined look, taken from the streamline modern style. New materials, such as nickel or chrome-plated steel, aluminium and bakelite, an early form of plastic, began to appear in furniture and decoration.

Throughout the Art Deco period, and particularly in the 1930s, the motifs of the décor expressed the function of the building. Theatres were decorated with sculpture which illustrated music, dance, and excitement; power companies showed sunrises, the Chrysler building showed stylized hood ornaments; The friezes of Palais de la Porte Dorée at the 1931 Paris Colonial Exposition showed the faces of the different nationalities of French colonies. The Streamline style made it appear that the building itself was in motion. The WPA murals of the 1930s featured ordinary people; factory workers, postal workers, families and farmers, in place of classical heroes.

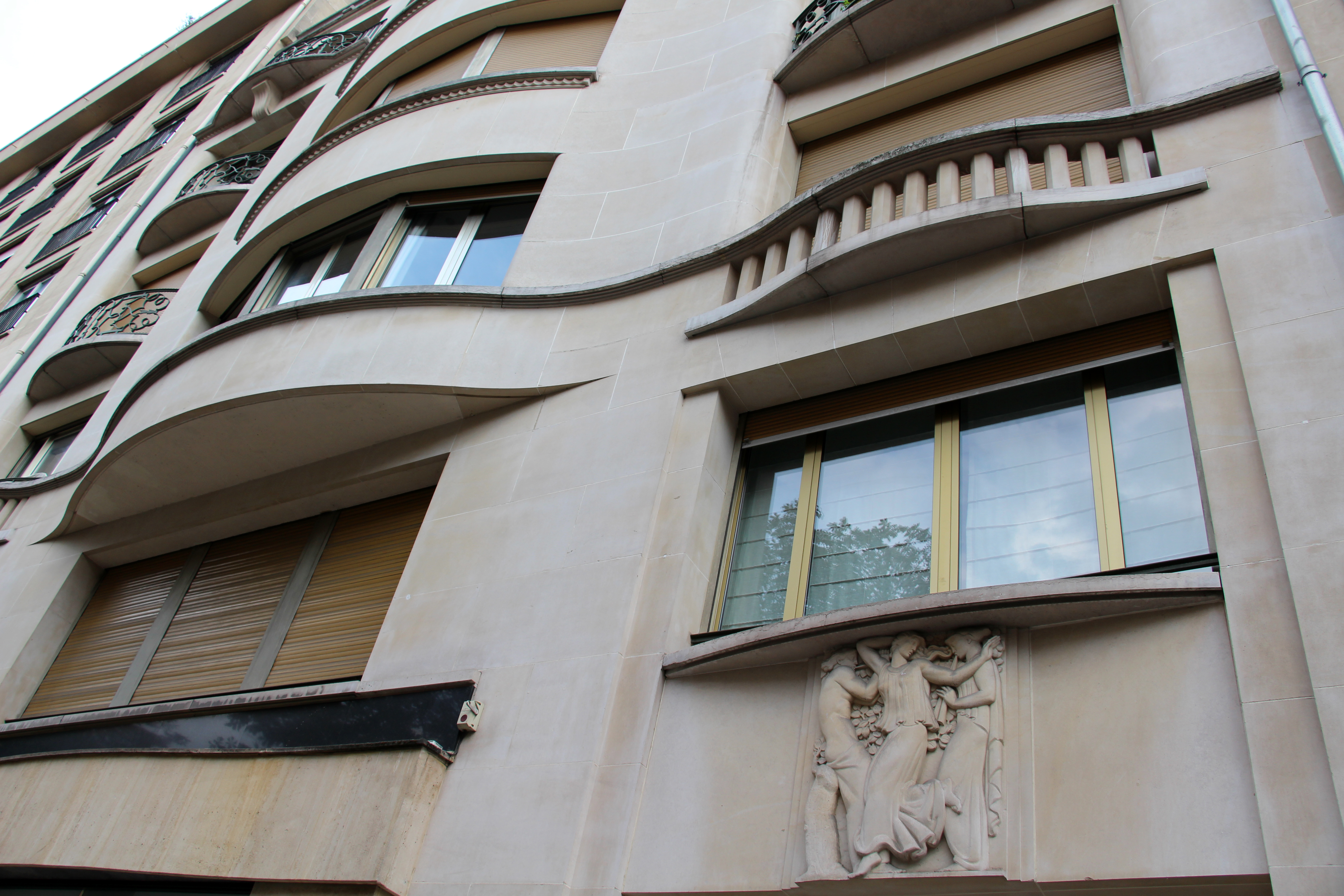
Curvy – Avenue Montaigne no. 26, Paris, by Louis Duhayon and Marcel Julien (1937)

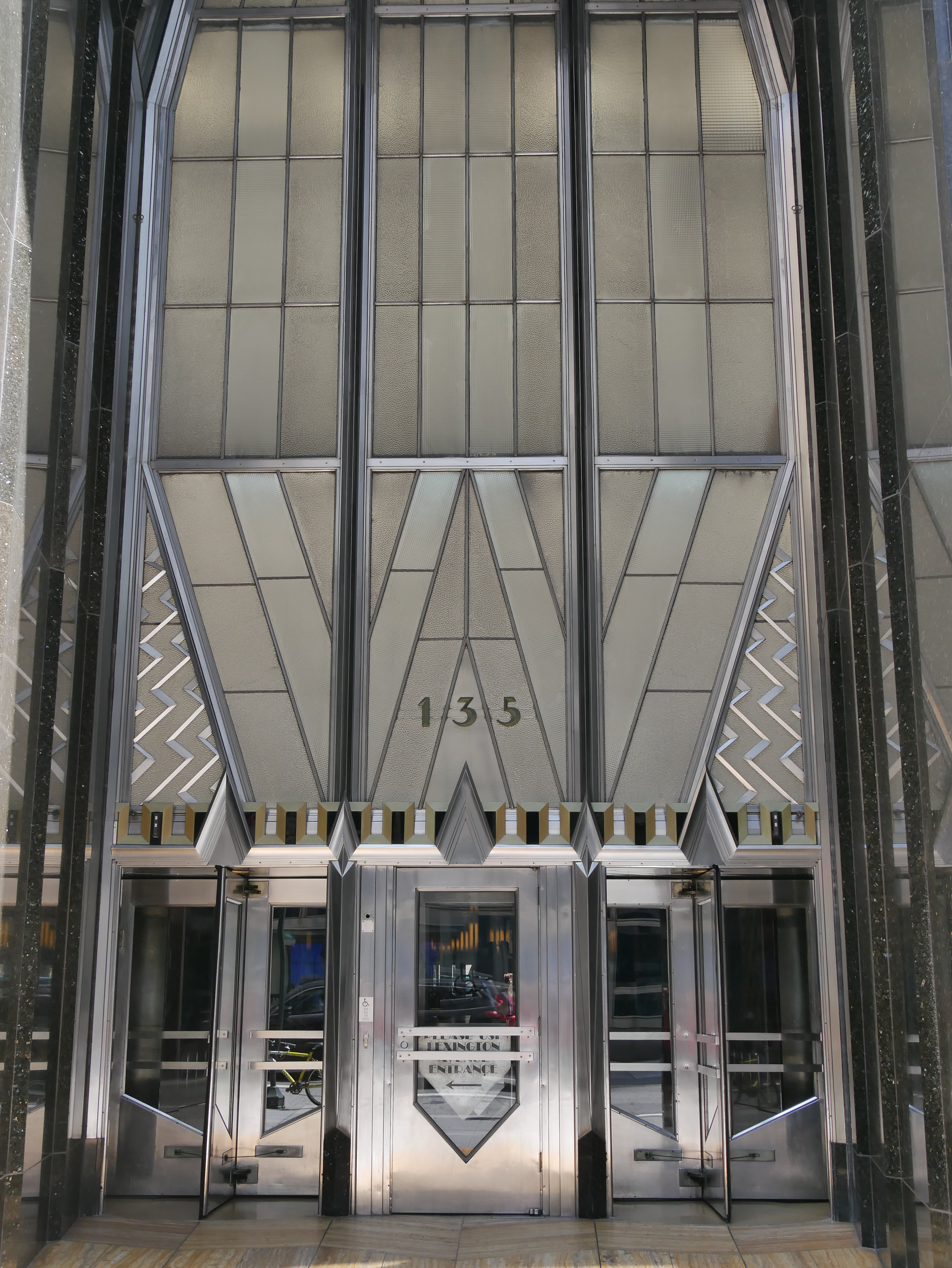
Angular – Entrance of the Chrysler Building in New York City, by William Van Allen (1928–1930)

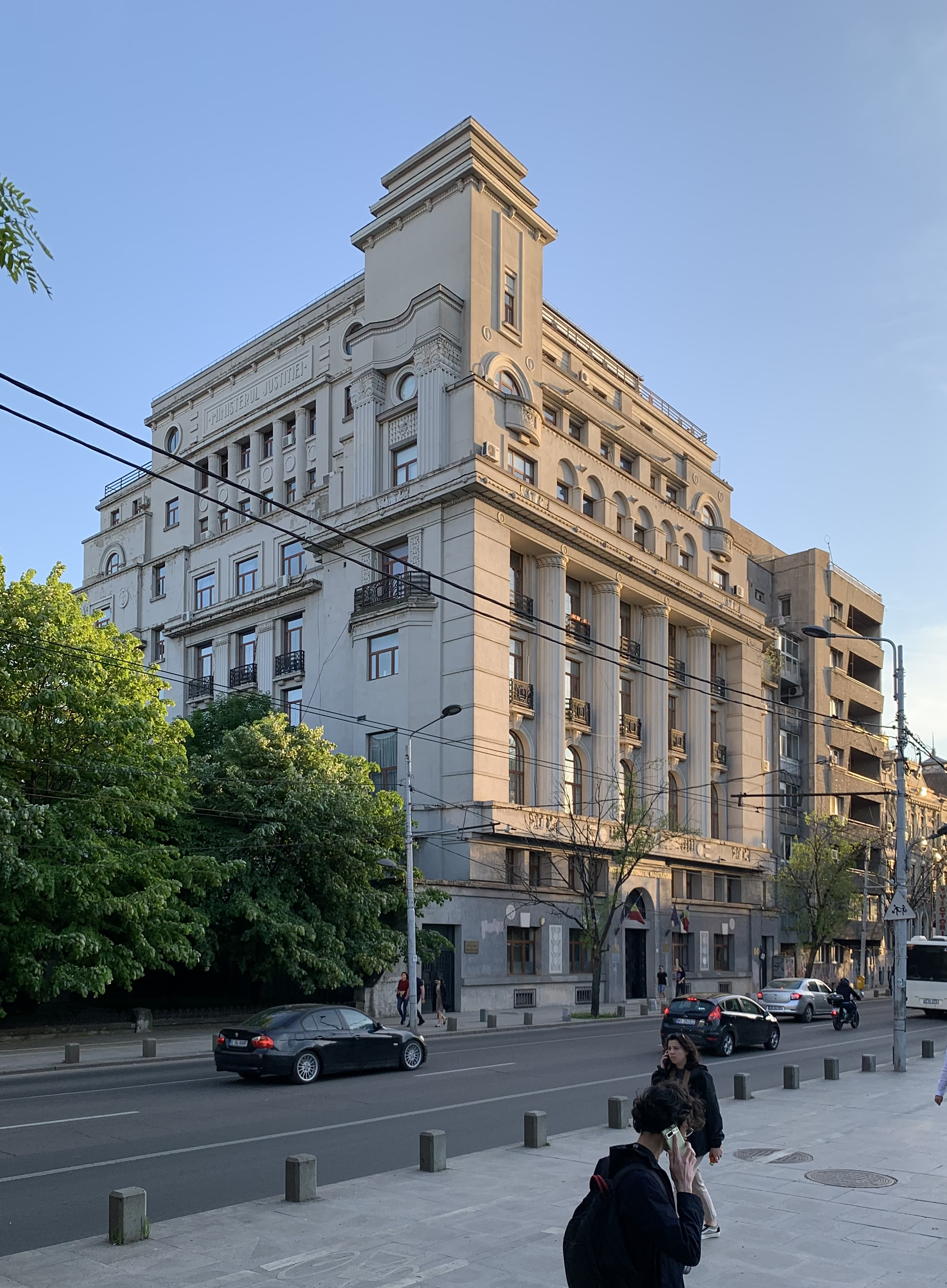
Asymmetric - Ministry of Justice (Bulevardul Regina Elisabeta no. 53), Bucharest, by Constantin Iotzu (1929–1932)

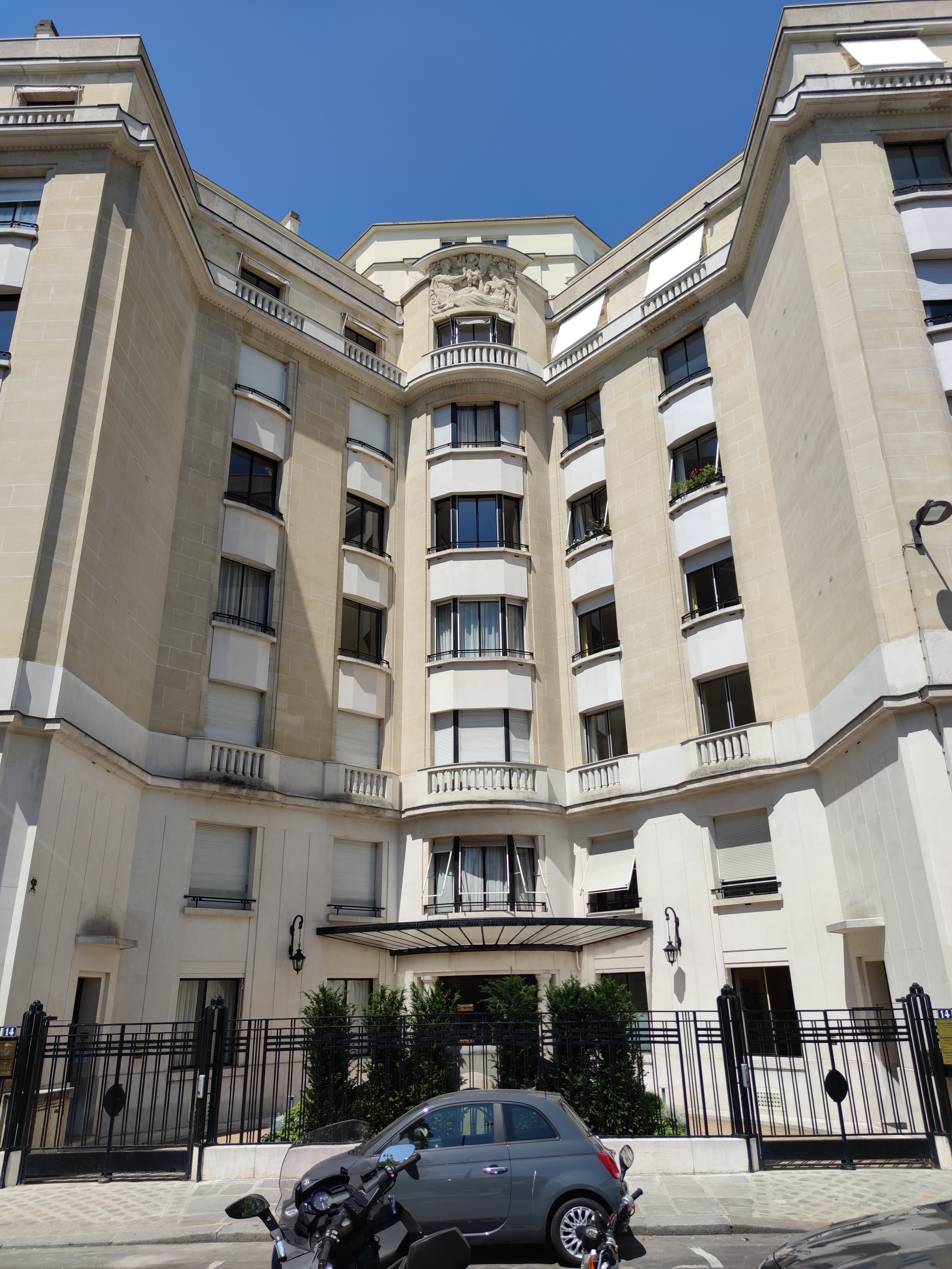
Symmetric – Rue Chomel no. 14, Paris, designed by Émile Boursier and sculpted by Raymond Delamarre (1934)

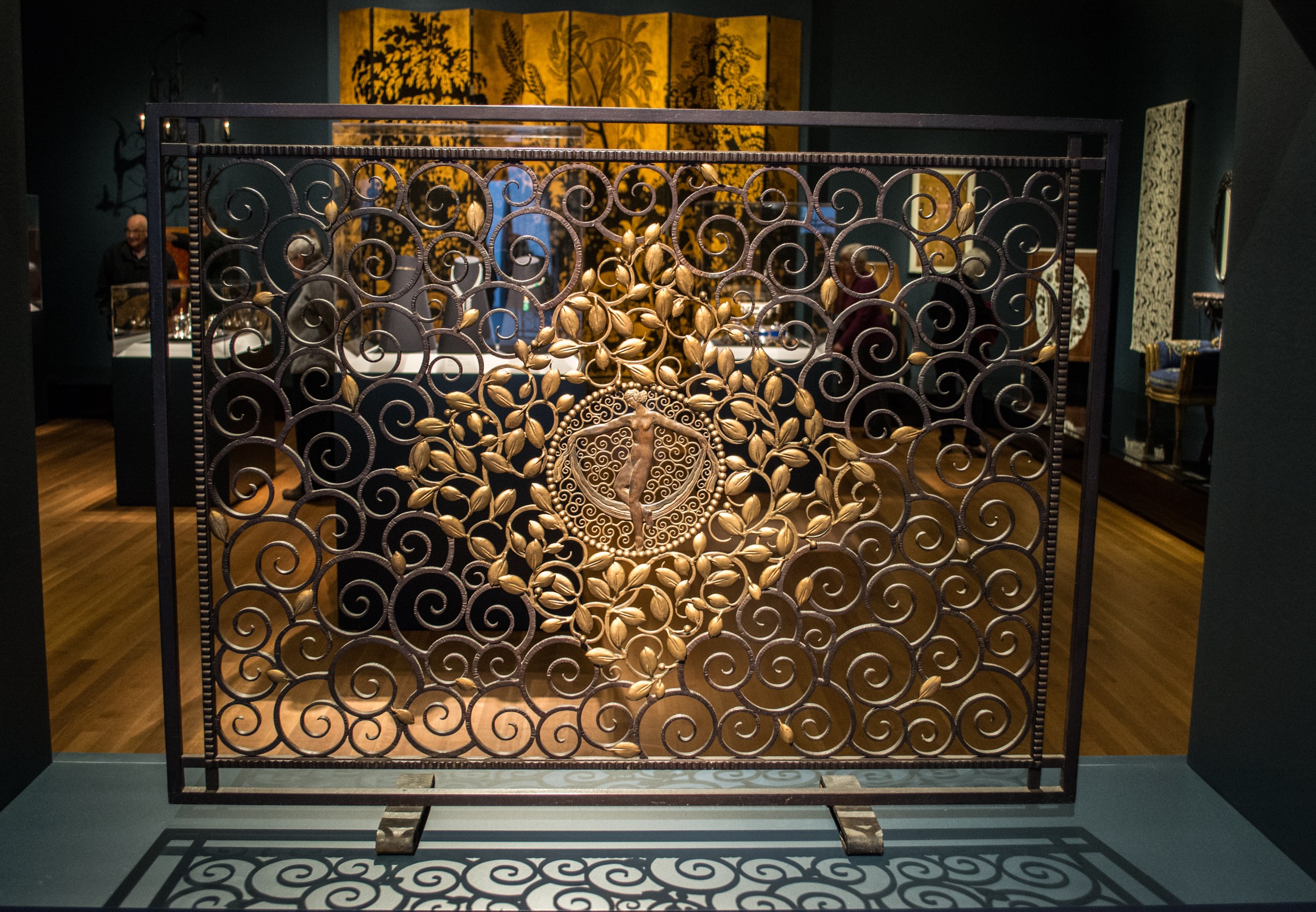
Maximalist – Fire screen, by Edgar Brandt (1925), wrought iron, in a temporary exhibition called the "Jazz Age" at the Cleveland Museum of Art, US

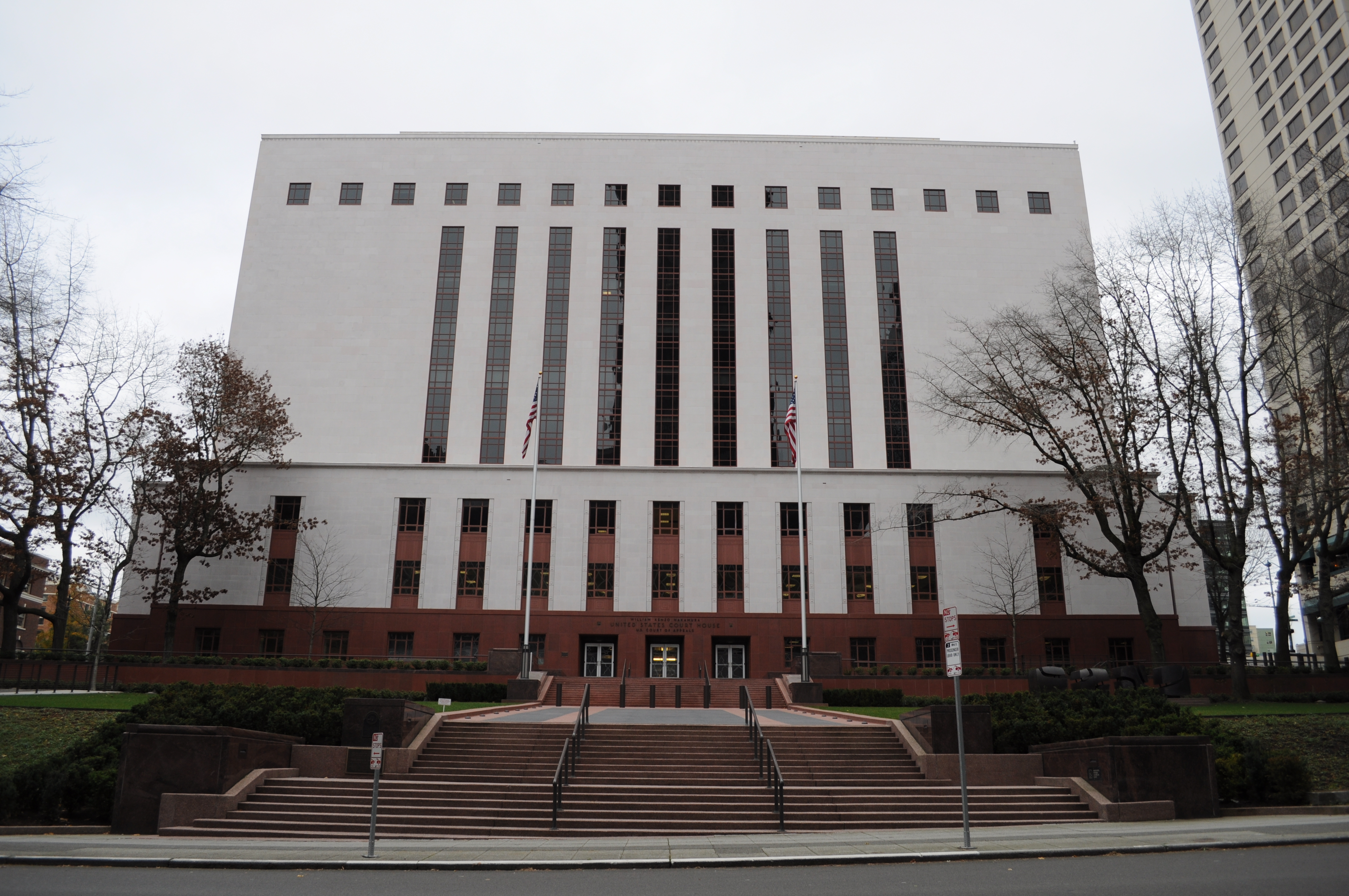
Minimalist – William K. Nakamura Federal Courthouse in Seattle, US, by Gilbert Stanley Underwood (1940)

Art Deco, like the complex times that engendered it, can best be characterized by a series of contradictions: minimalist vs maximalist, angular vs fluid, ziggurat vs streamline, symmetrical vs irregular, to name a few. The iconography chosen by Art Deco artists to express the period is also laden with contradictions. Fair maidens in 18th-century dress seem to coexist with chic sophisticated ladies and recumbent nudes, and flashes of lightning illuminate stylized rosebuds.

== Furniture ==
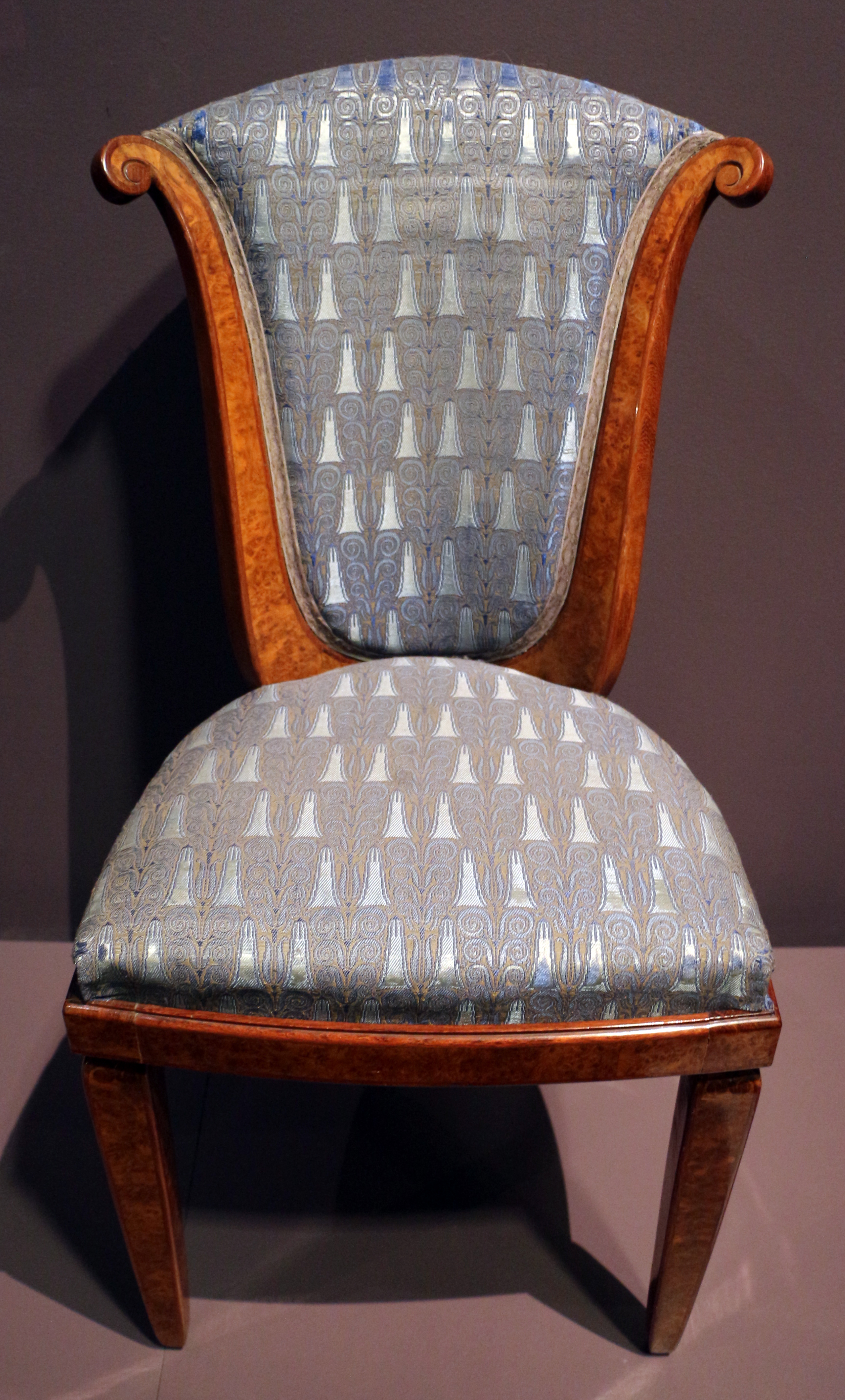
Chair by Paul Follot (1912–1914)

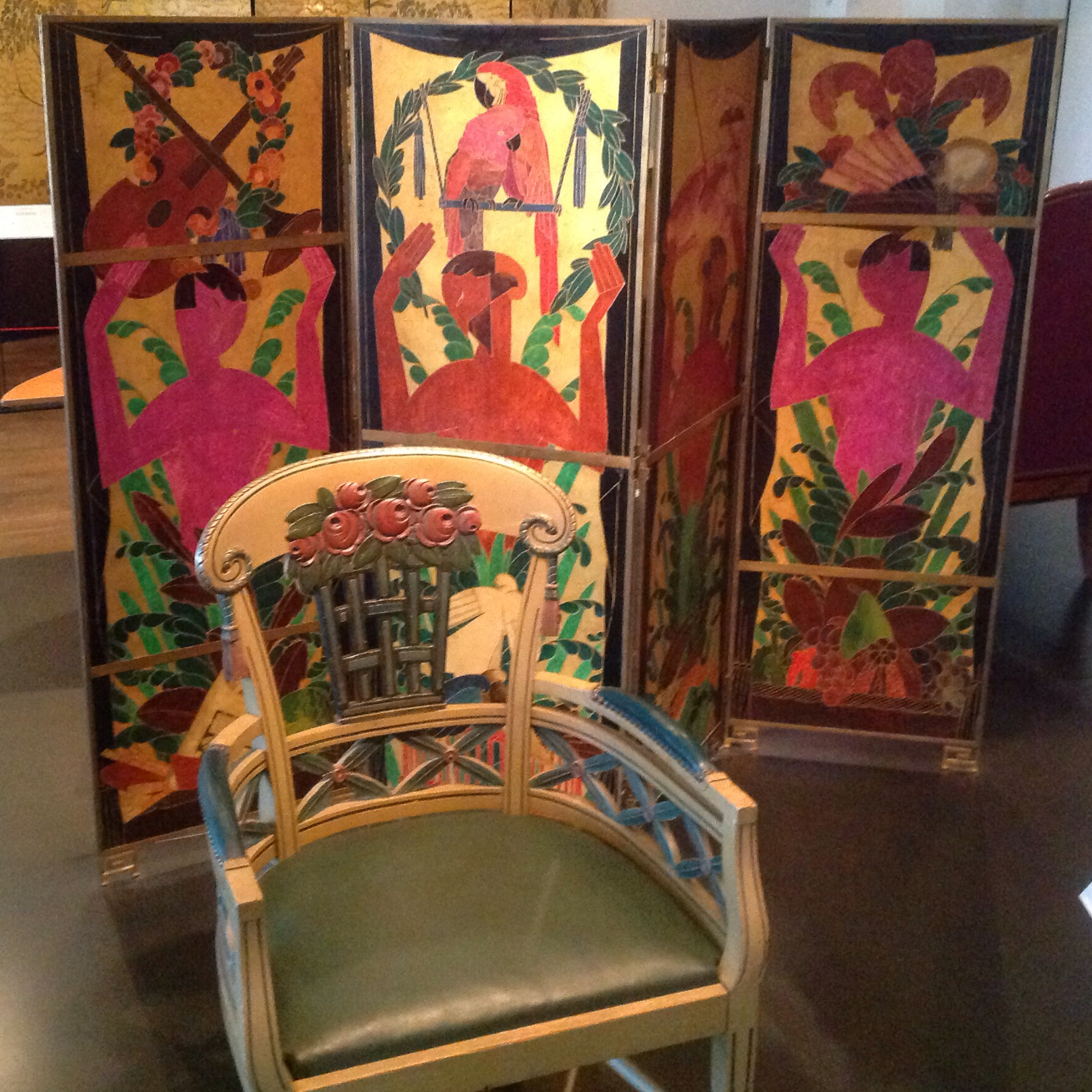
Armchair by Louis Süe (1912) and painted screen by André Mare (1920)

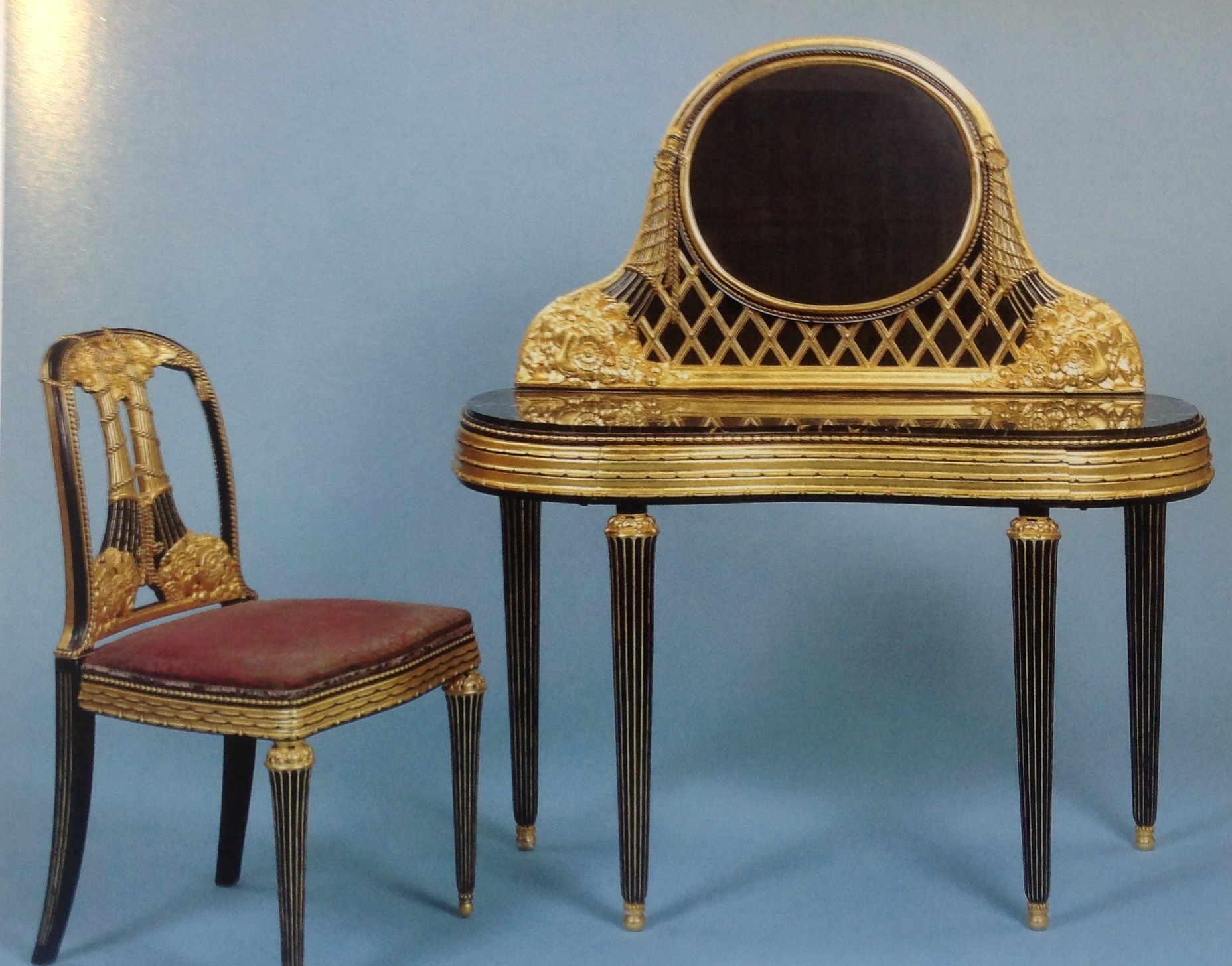
Dressing table and chair of marble and encrusted, lacquered, and gilded wood by Follot (1919–20)

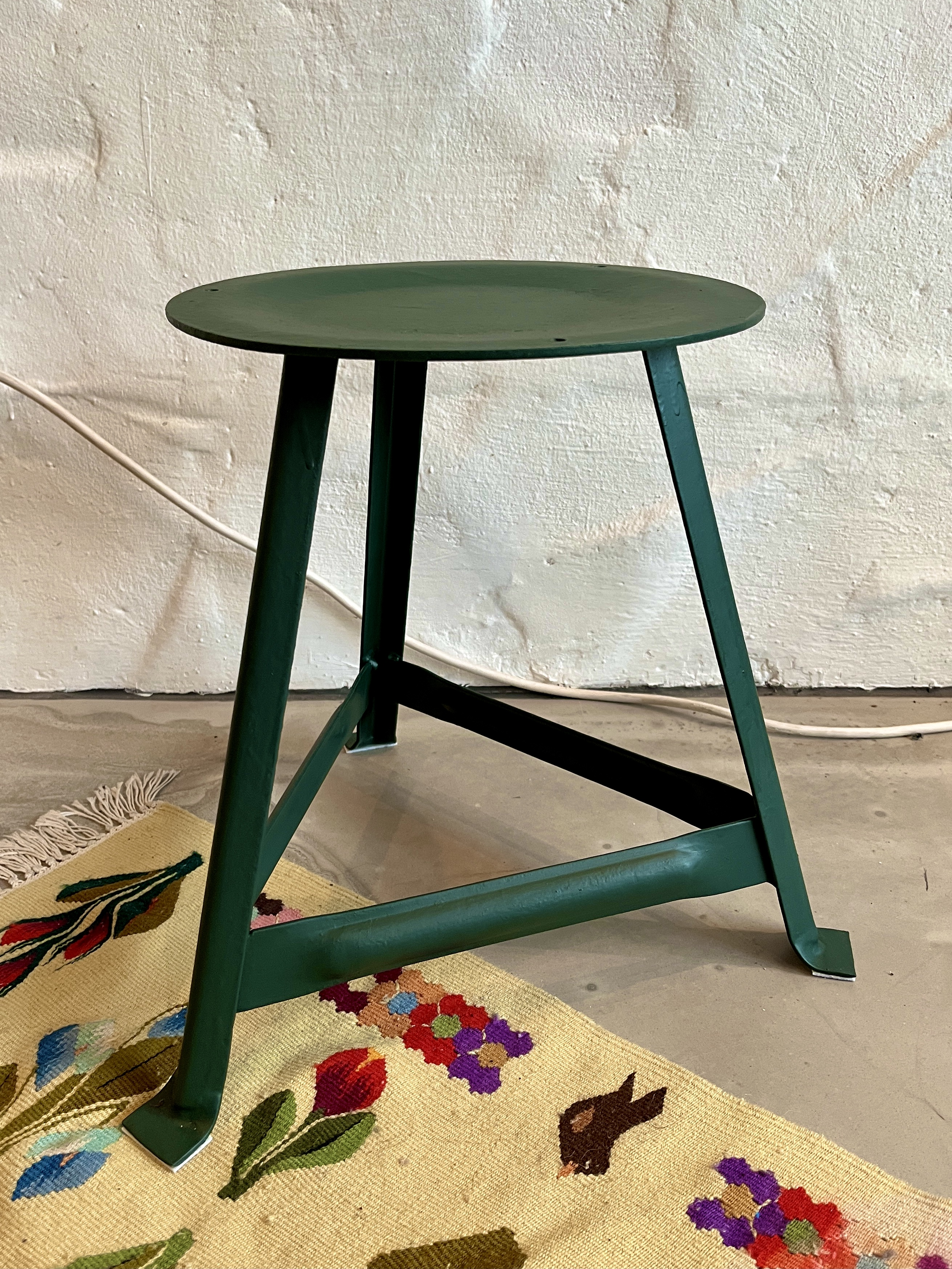
Green metal stool made in Bucharest, Romania (1920)

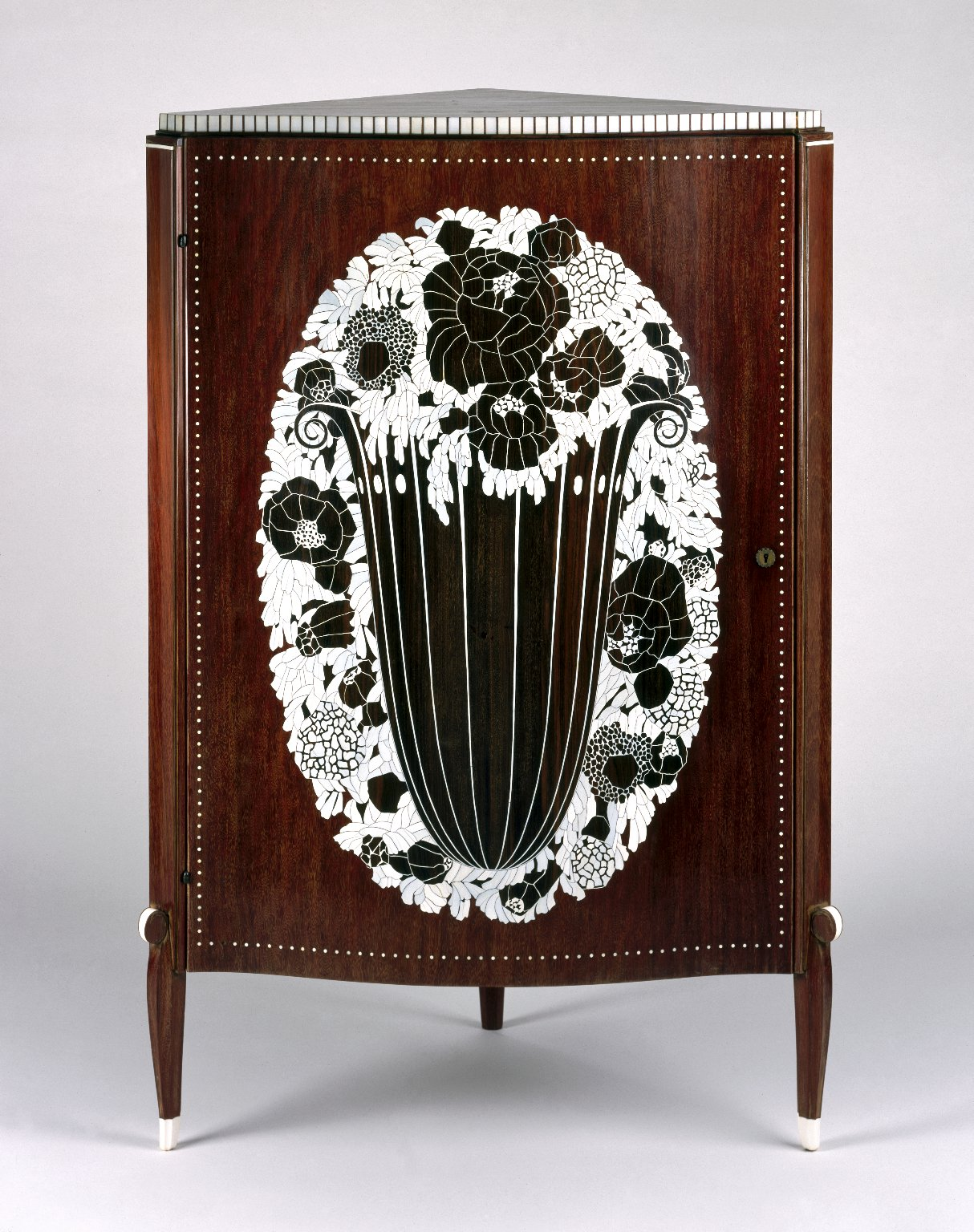
Corner cabinet of Mahogany with rose basket design of inlaid ivory by Émile-Jacques Ruhlmann (1923)

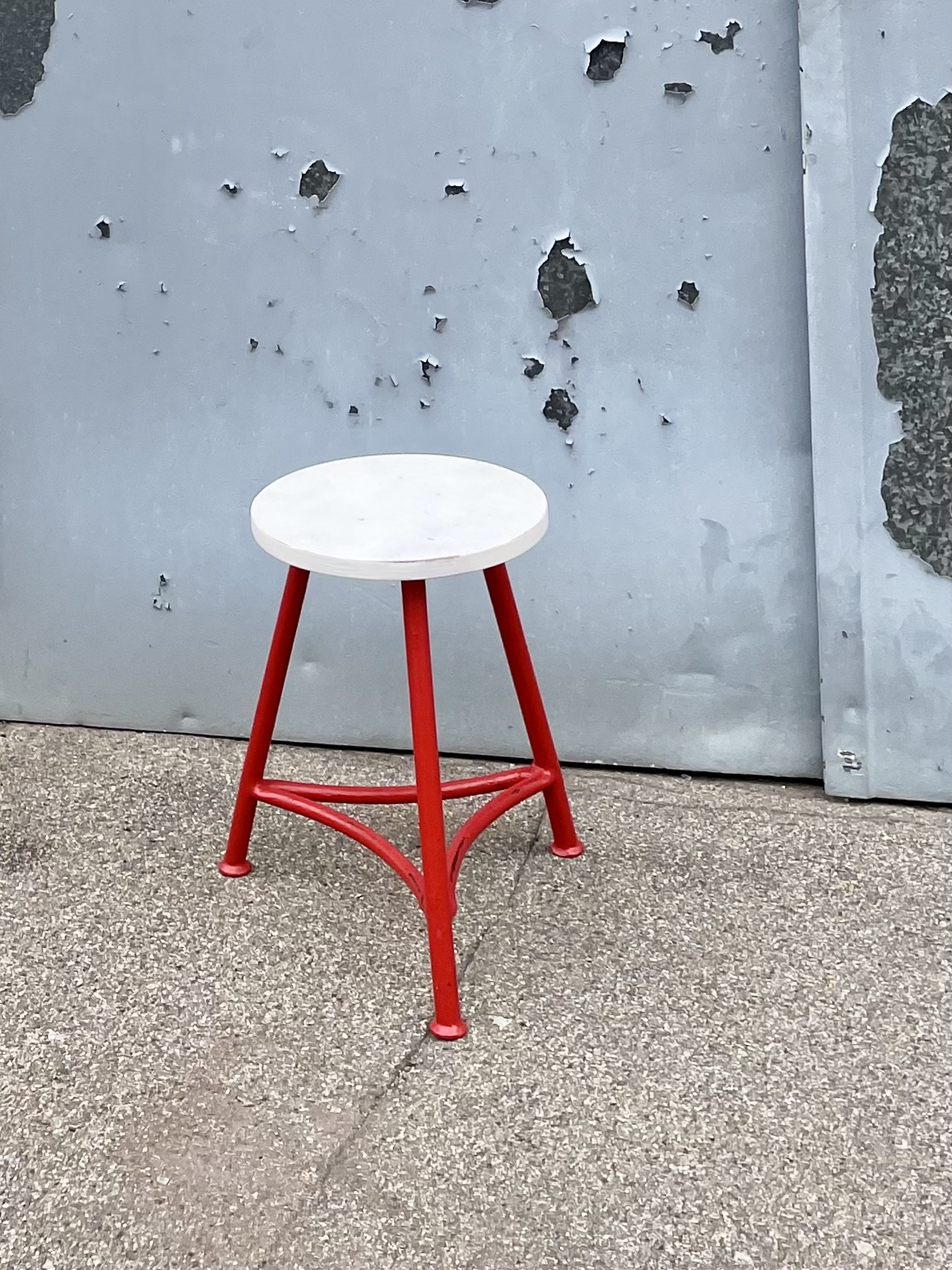
Stool made of metal and wood in Lyon, France (1925)

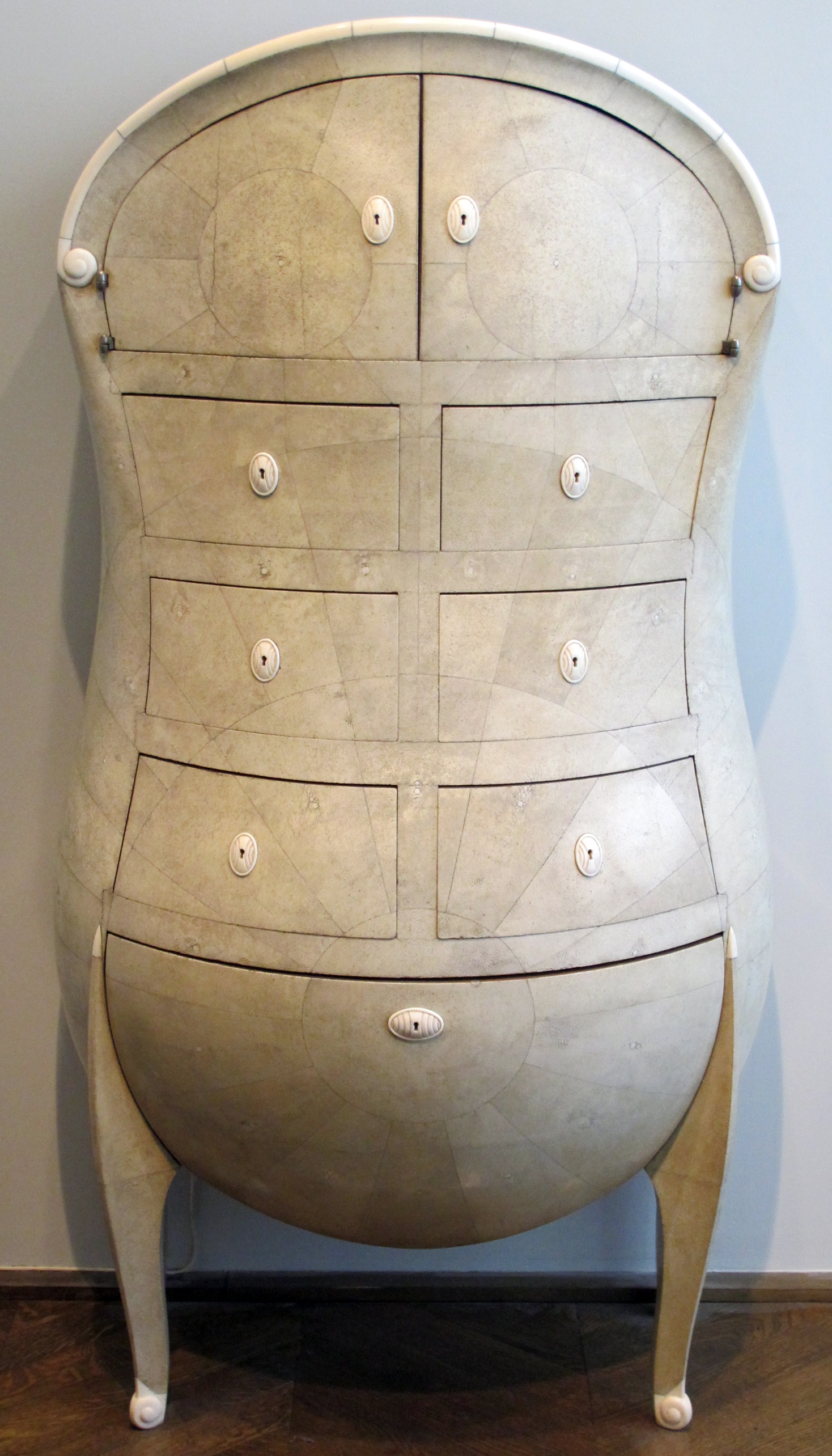
Cabinet covered with shagreen or sharkskin by André Groult (1925)

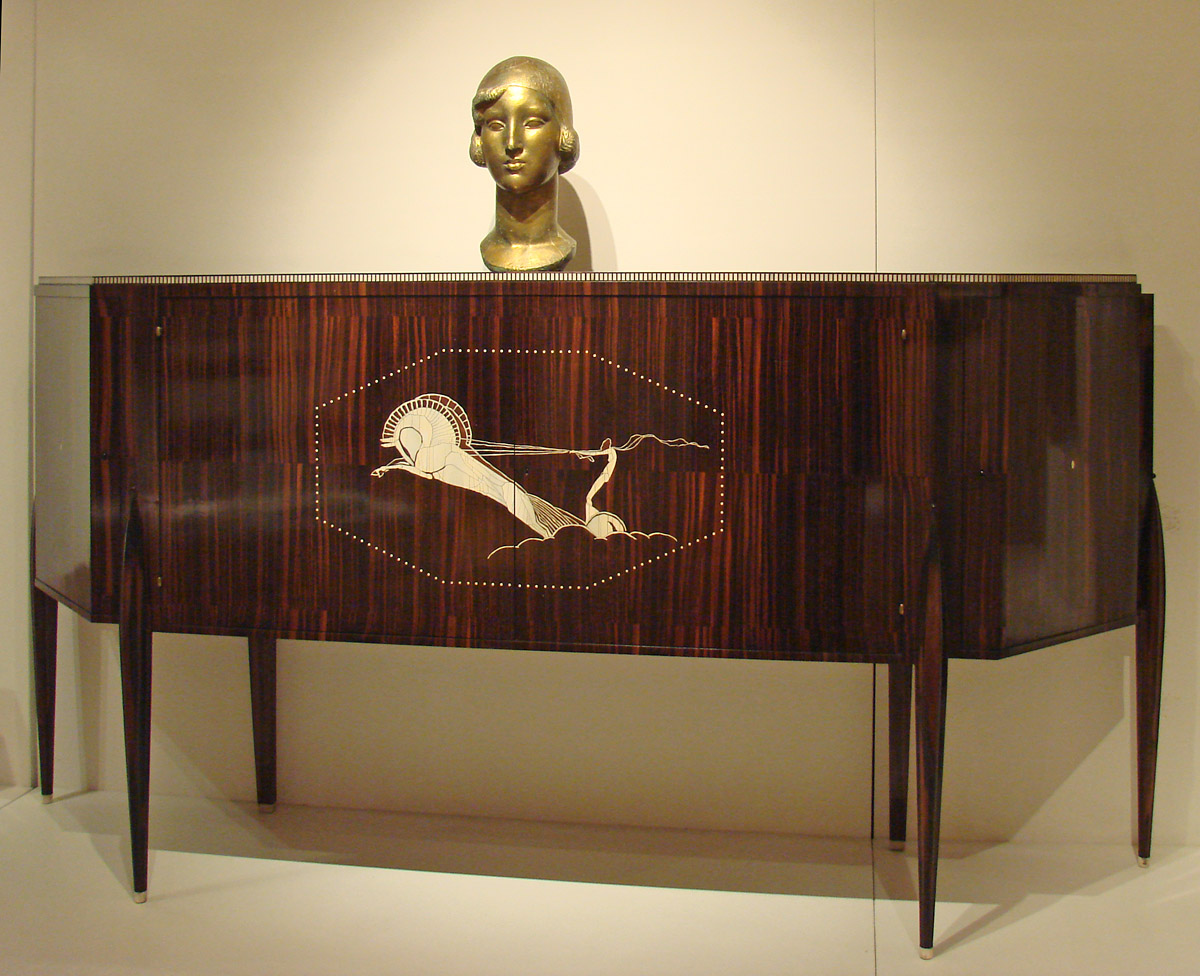
Cabinet by Ruhlmann (1926)

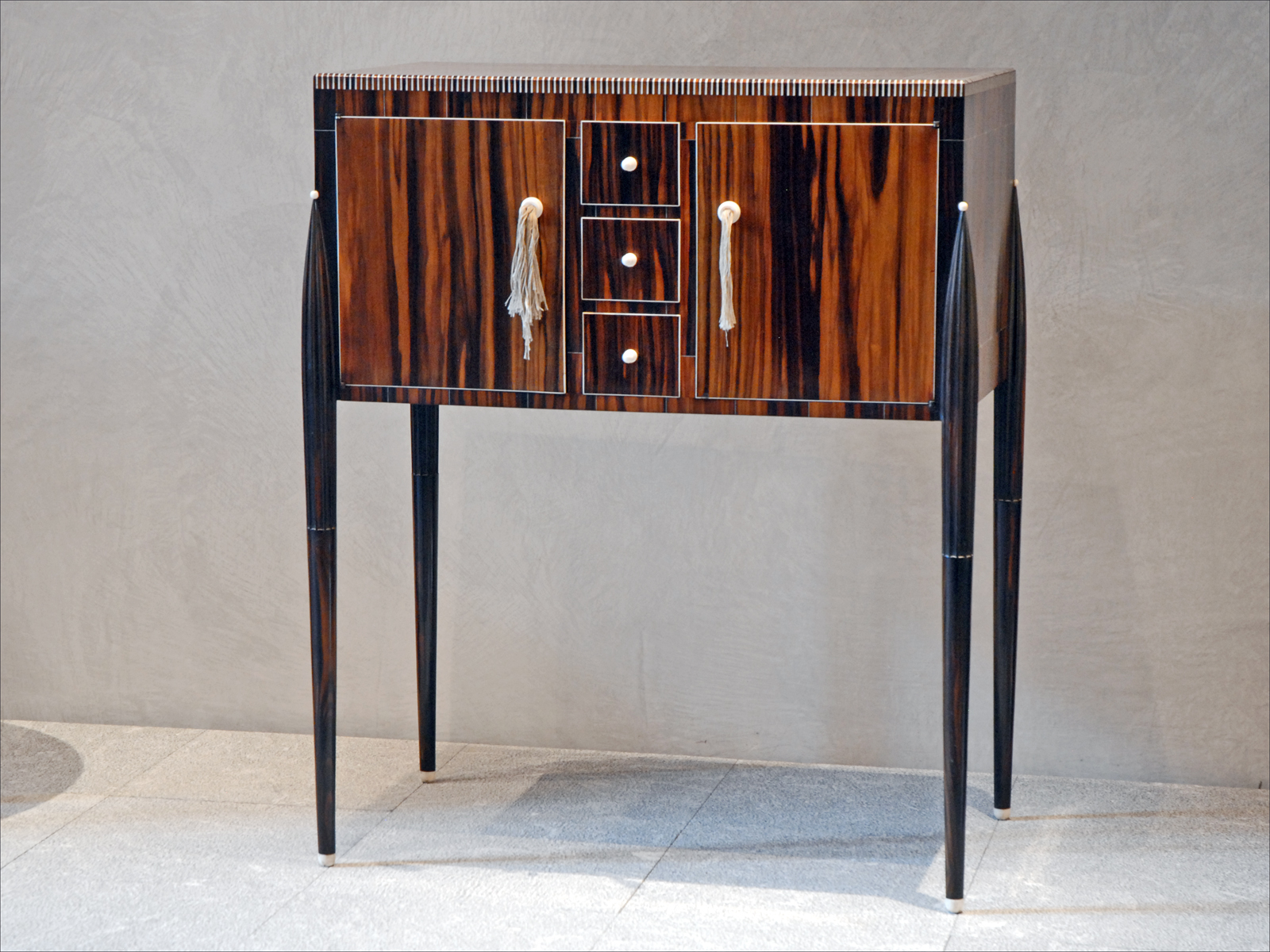
Cabinet design by Ruhlmann

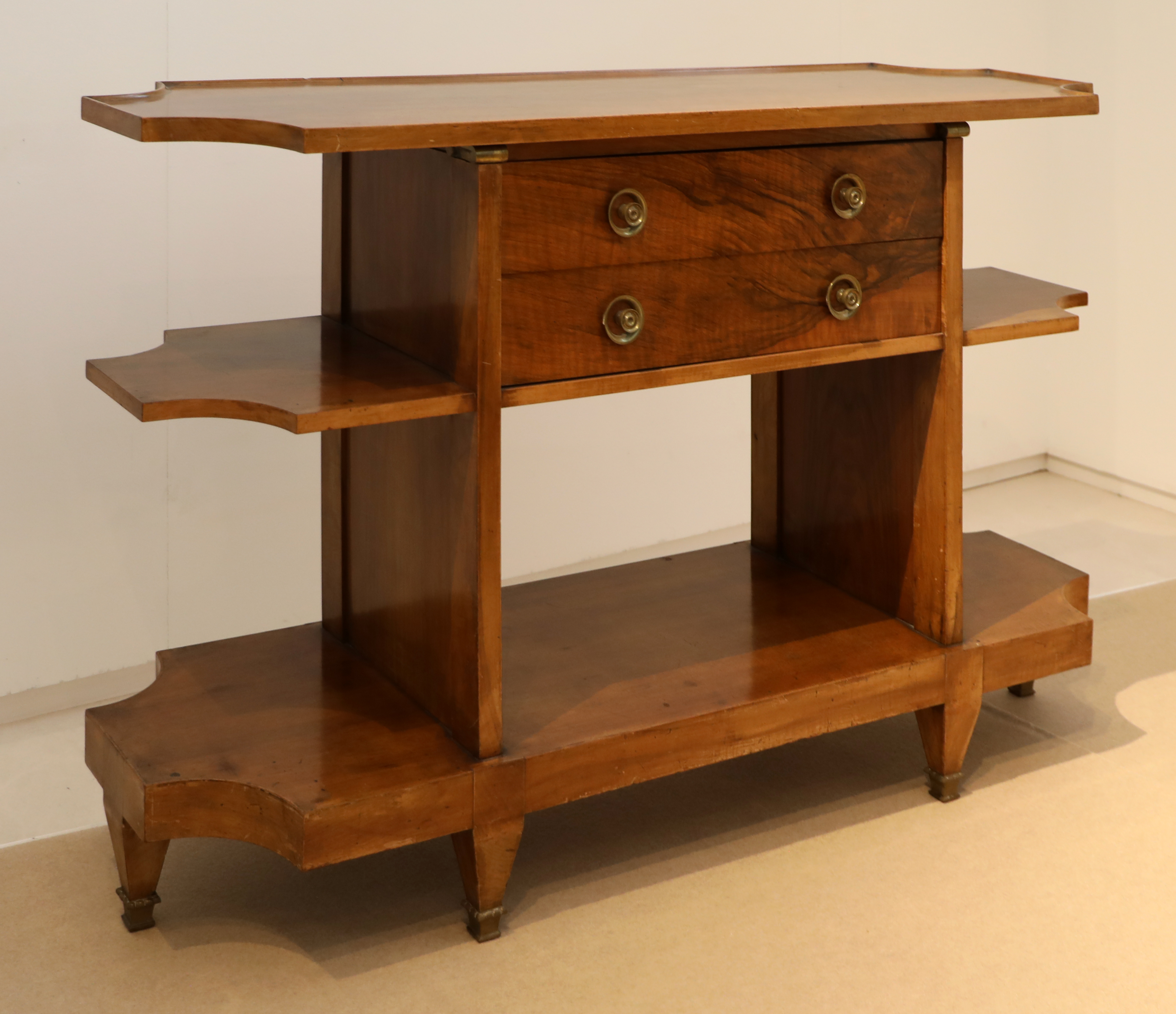
Furniture by Gio Ponti (1927)

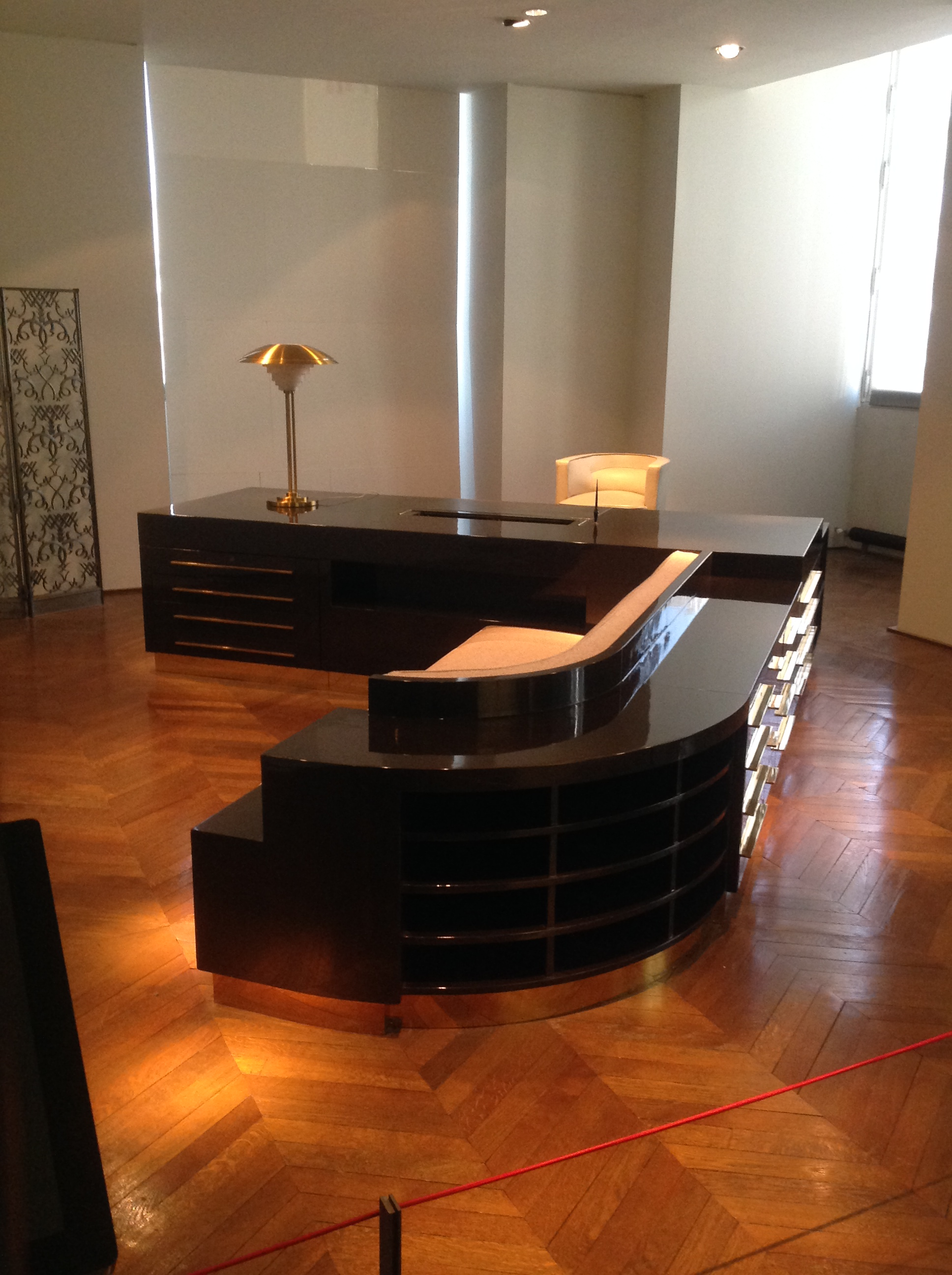
Desk of an administrator, by Michel Roux-Spitz for the 1930 Salon of Decorative Artists

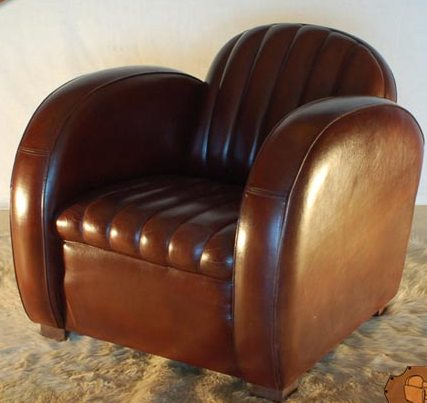
Art Deco club chair (1930s)

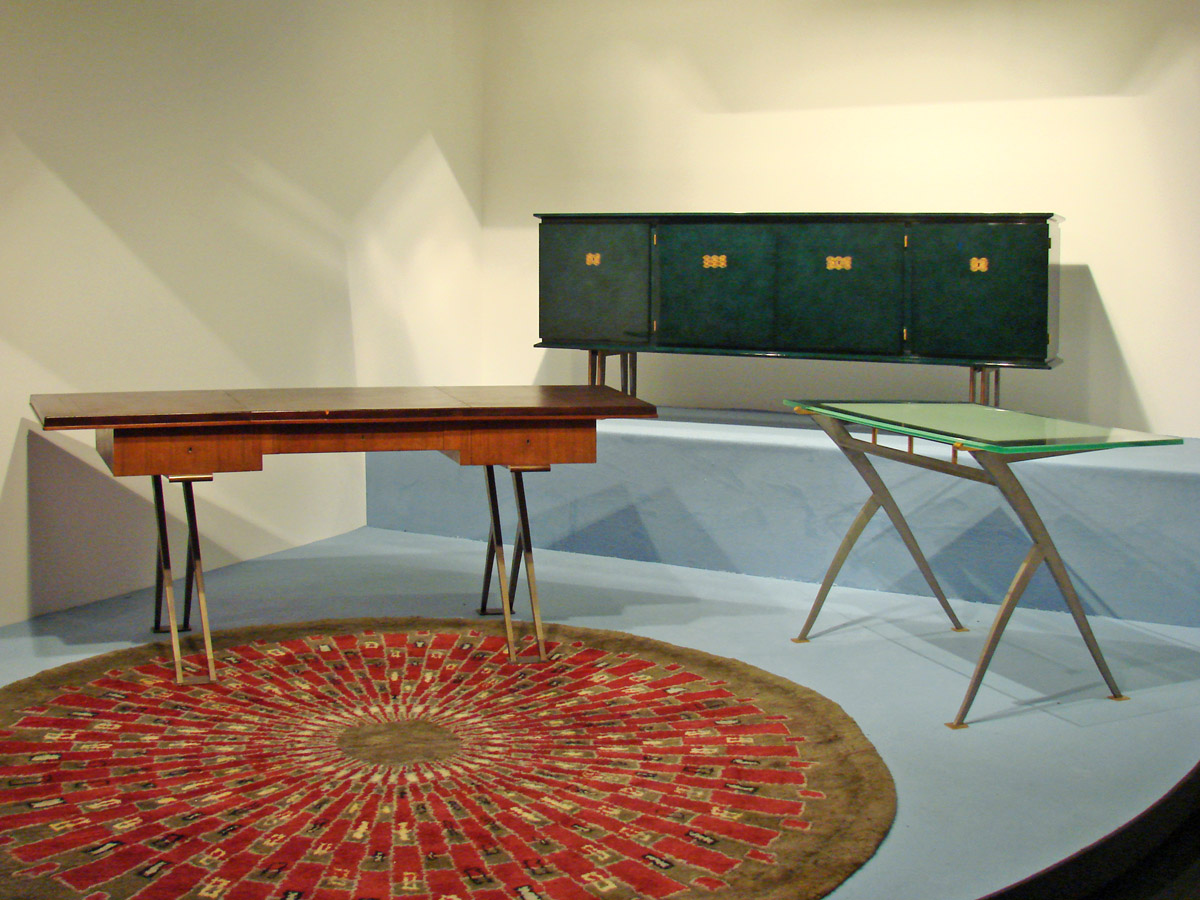
Late Art Deco furniture and rug by Jules Leleu (1930s)

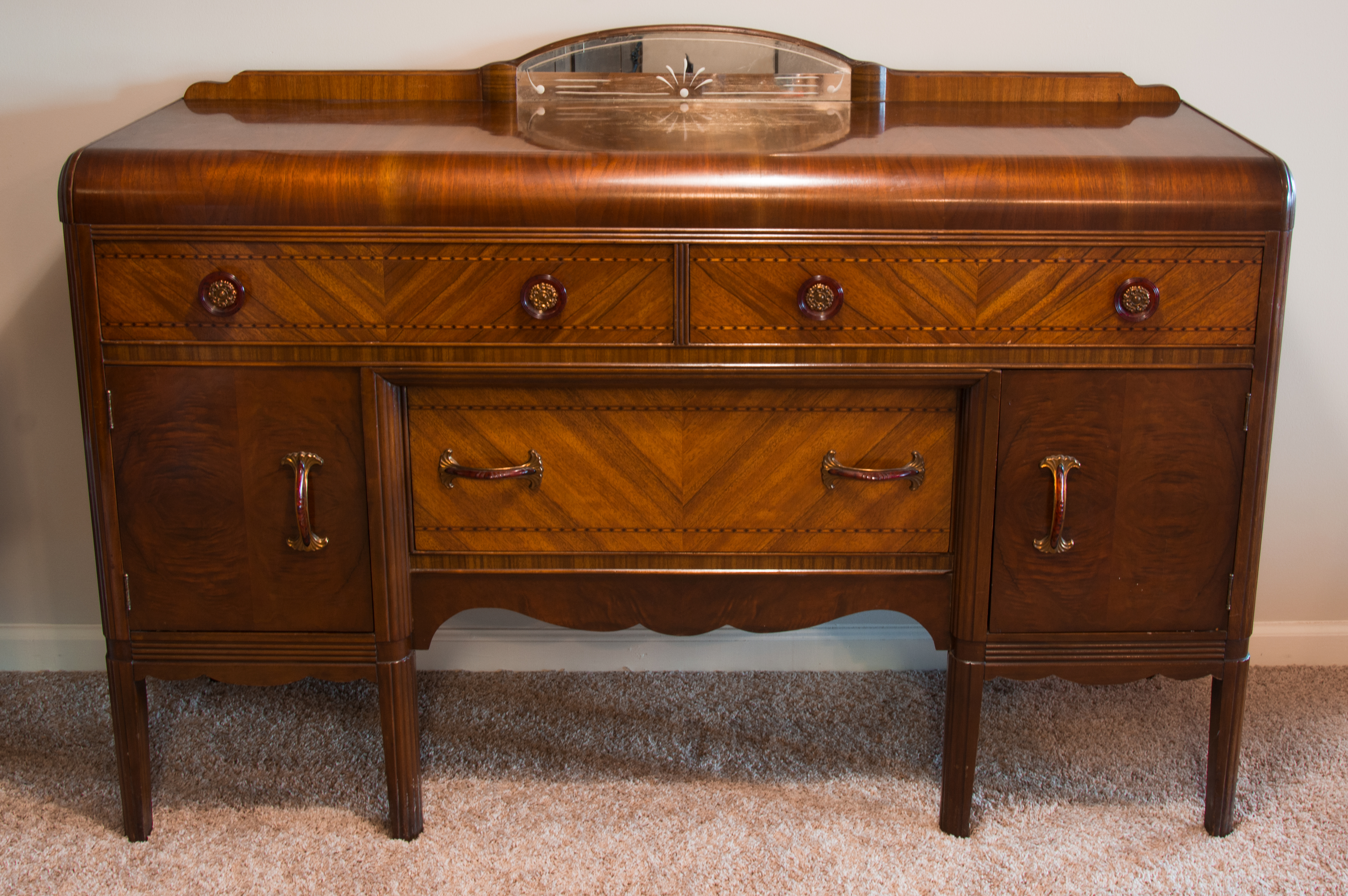
A Waterfall style buffet table

French furniture from 1910 until the early 1920s was largely an updating of French traditional furniture styles, and the art nouveau designs of Louis Majorelle, Charles Plumet and other manufacturers. French furniture manufacturers felt threatened by the growing popularity of German manufacturers and styles, particularly the Biedermeier style, which was simple and clean-lined. The French designer Frantz Jourdain, the president of the Paris Salon d'Automne, invited designers from Munich to participate in the 1910 Salon. French designers saw the new German style and decided to meet the German challenge. The French designers decided to present new French styles in the Salon of 1912. The rules of the Salon indicated that only modern styles would be permitted. All of the major French furniture designers took part in Salon: Paul Follot, Paul Iribe, Maurice Dufrêne, André Groult, André Mare and Louis Suë took part, presenting new works that updated the traditional French styles of Louis XVI and Louis Philippe with more angular corners inspired by Cubism and brighter colours inspired by Fauvism and the Nabis.

The painter André Mare and furniture designer Louis Süe both participated the 1912 Salon. After the war the two men joined to form their own company, formally called the Compagnie des Arts Française, but usually known simply as Suë and Mare. Unlike the prominent art nouveau designers like Louis Majorelle, who personally designed every piece, they assembled a team of skilled craftsmen and produced complete interior designs, including furniture, glassware, carpets, ceramics, wallpaper and lighting. Their work featured bright colors and furniture and fine woods, such as ebony encrusted with mother of pearl, abalone and silvered metal to create bouquets of flowers. They designed everything from the interiors of ocean liners to perfume bottles for the label of Jean Patou.The firm prospered in the early 1920s, but the two men were better craftsmen than businessmen. The firm was sold in 1928, and both men left.

The most prominent furniture designer at the 1925 Decorative Arts Exposition was Émile-Jacques Ruhlmann, from Alsace. He first exhibited his works at the 1913 Autumn Salon, then had his own pavilion, the "House of the Rich Collector", at the 1925 Exposition. He used only most rare and expensive materials, including ebony, mahogany, rosewood, ambon and other exotic woods, decorated with inlays of ivory, tortoise shell, mother of pearl, Little pompoms of silk decorated the handles of drawers of the cabinets. His furniture was based upon 18th-century models, but simplified and reshaped. In all of his work, the interior structure of the furniture was completely concealed. The framework usually of oak, was completely covered with an overlay of thin strips of wood, then covered by a second layer of strips of rare and expensive woods. This was then covered with a veneer and polished, so that the piece looked as if it had been cut out of a single block of wood. Contrast to the dark wood was provided by inlays of ivory, and ivory key plates and handles. According to Ruhlmann, armchairs had to be designed differently according to the functions of the rooms where they appeared; living room armchairs were designed to be welcoming, office chairs comfortable, and salon chairs voluptuous. Only a small number of pieces of each design of furniture was made, and the average price of one of his beds or cabinets was greater than the price of an average house.

Jules Leleu was a traditional furniture designer who moved smoothly into Art Deco in the 1920s; he designed the furniture for the dining room of the Élysée Palace, and for the first-class cabins of the steamship Normandie. his style was characterized by the use of ebony, Macassar wood, walnut, with decoration of plaques of ivory and mother of pearl. He introduced the style of lacquered Art Deco furniture in the late 1920s, and in the late 1930s introduced furniture made of metal with panels of smoked glass. In Italy, the designer Gio Ponti was famous for his streamlined designs.

The costly and exotic furniture of Ruhlmann and other traditionalists infuriated modernists, including the architect Le Corbusier, causing him to write a famous series of articles denouncing the arts décoratif style. He attacked furniture made only for the rich and called upon designers to create furniture made with inexpensive materials and modern style, which ordinary people could afford. He designed his own chairs, created to be inexpensive and mass-produced.

In the 1930s, furniture designs adapted to the form, with smoother surfaces and curved forms. The masters of the late style included Donald Deskey, who was one of the most influential designers; he created the interior of the Radio City Music Hall. He used a mixture of traditional and very modern materials, including aluminium, chrome, and bakelite, an early form of plastic. Other top designers of Art Deco furniture of the 1930s in the United States included Gilbert Rohde, Warren McArthur, and Kem Weber.

The Waterfall style was popular in the 1930s and 1940s, the most prevalent Art Deco form of furniture at the time. Pieces were typically of plywood finished with blond veneer and with rounded edges, resembling a waterfall.

== Design ==
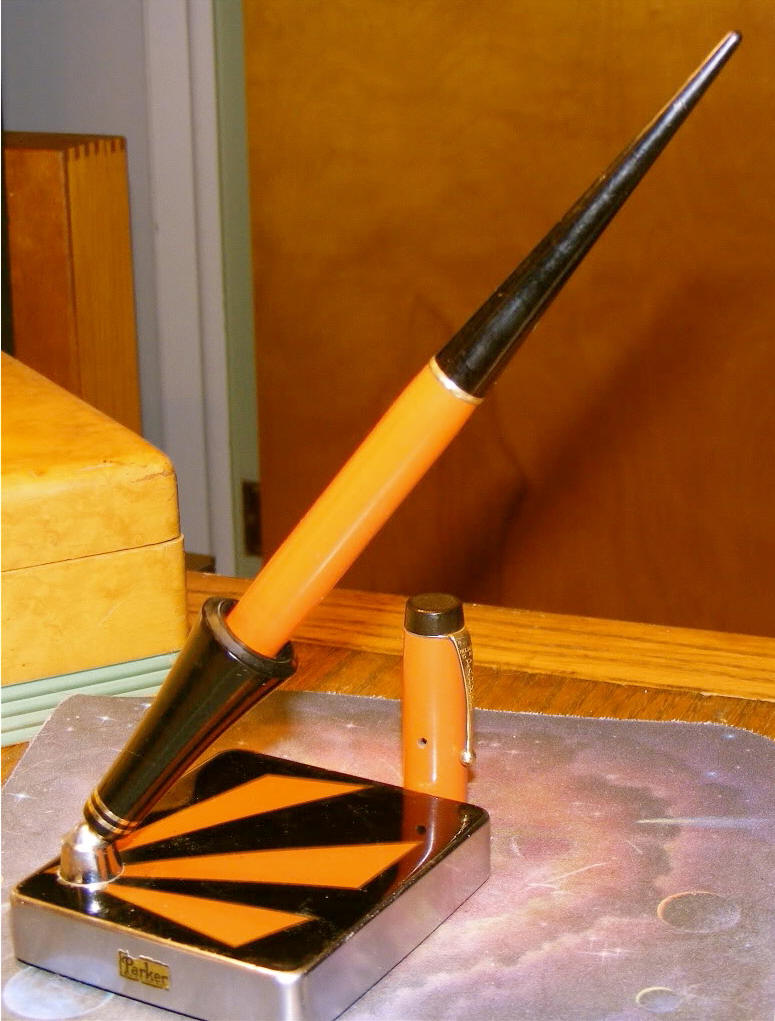
Parker Duofold desk set (c. 1930)

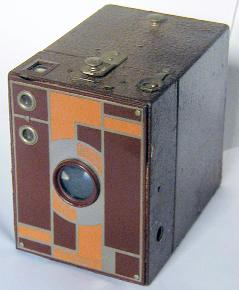
Beau Brownie camera, design by Walter Dorwin Teague for Eastman Kodak (1930)

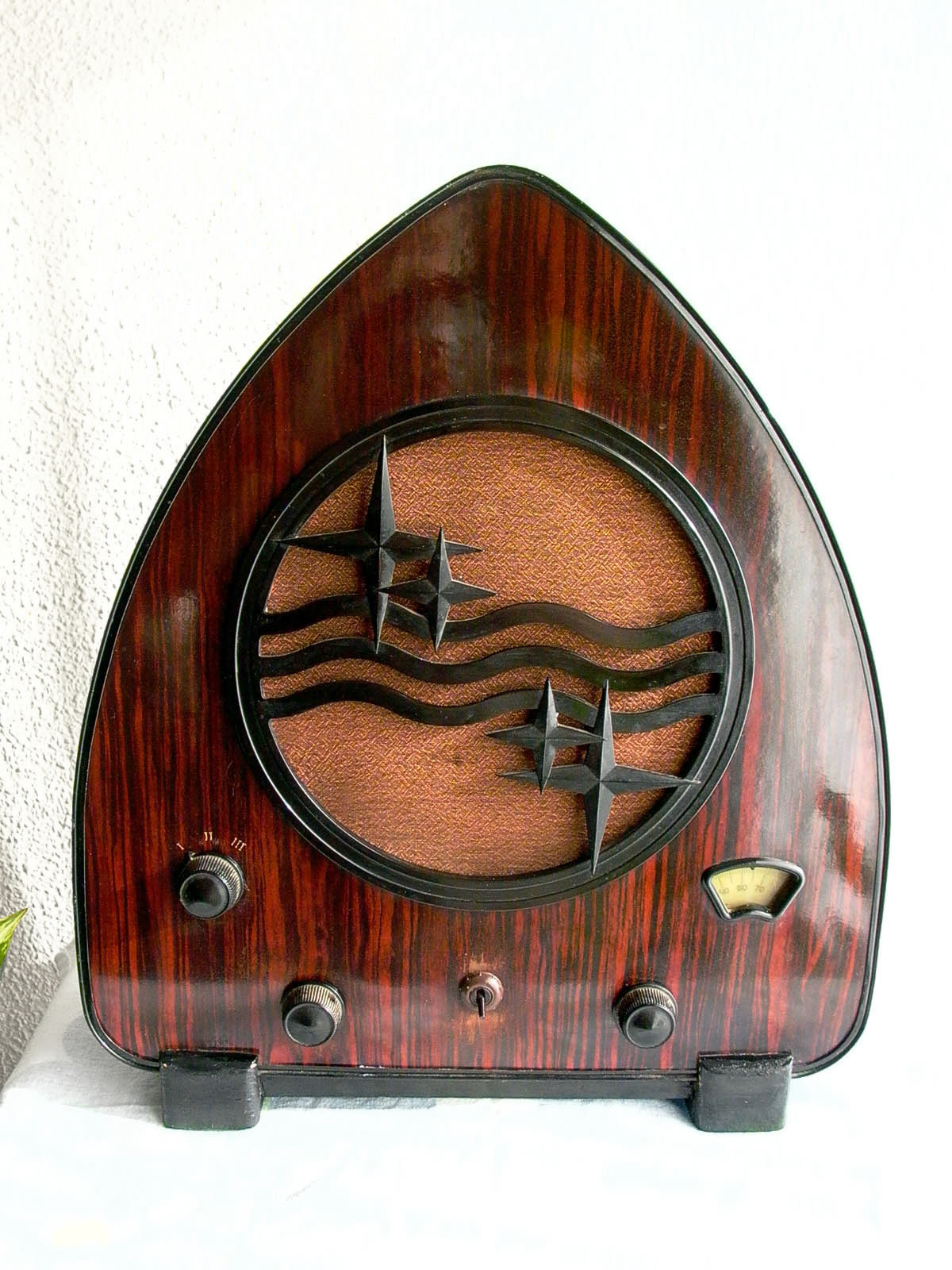
Philips radio set (1931)

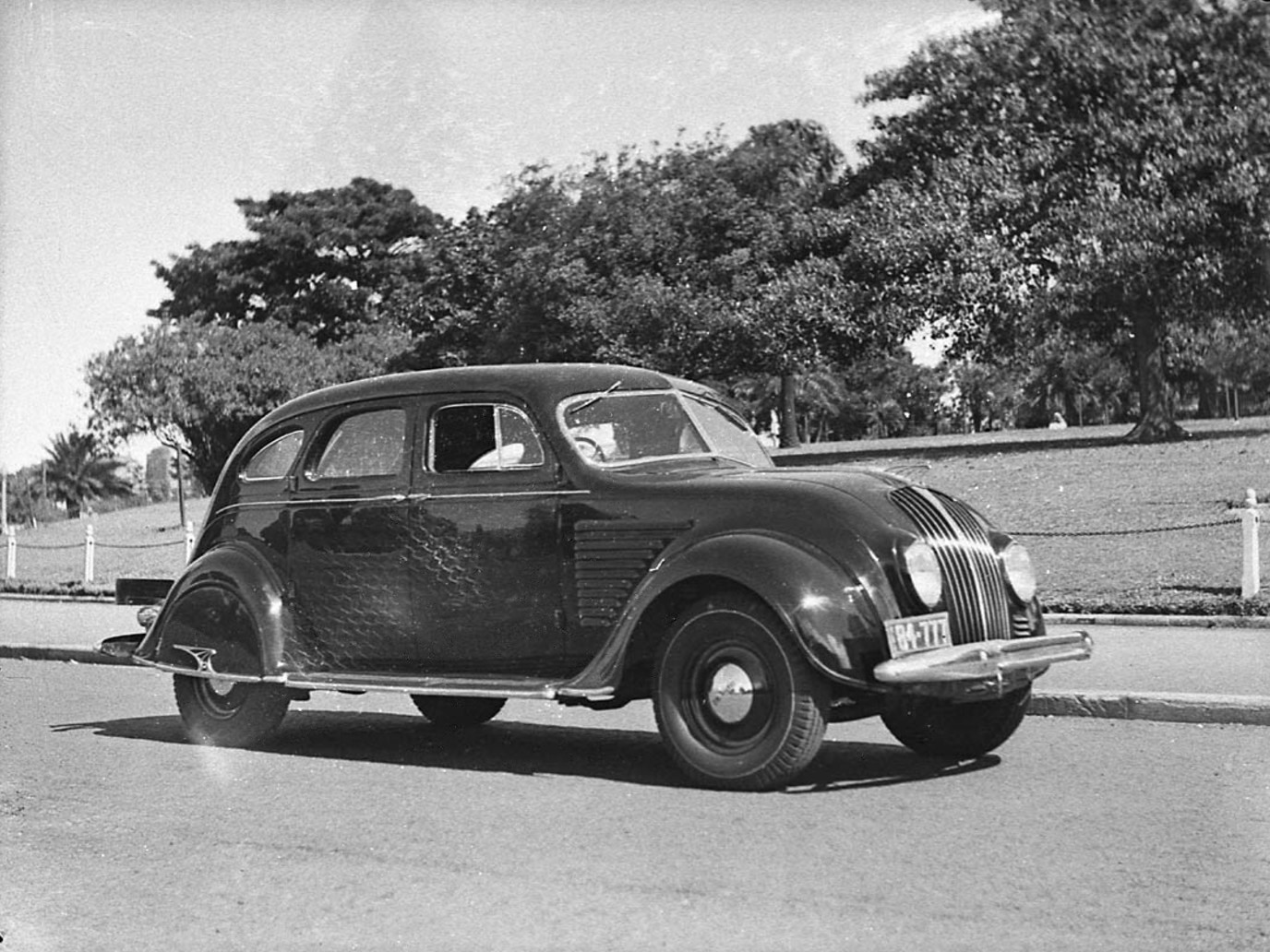
Chrysler Airflow sedan, designed by Carl Breer (1934)

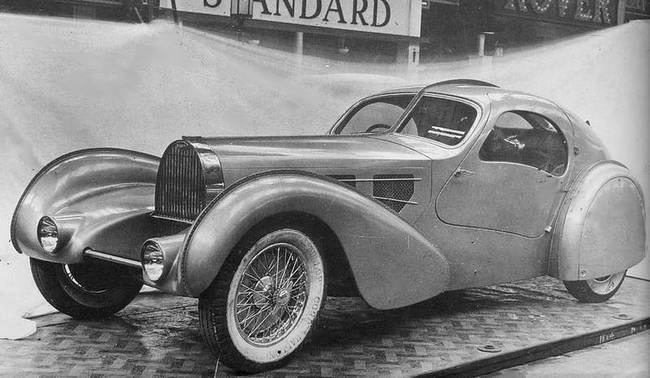
Bugatti Aérolithe (1936)

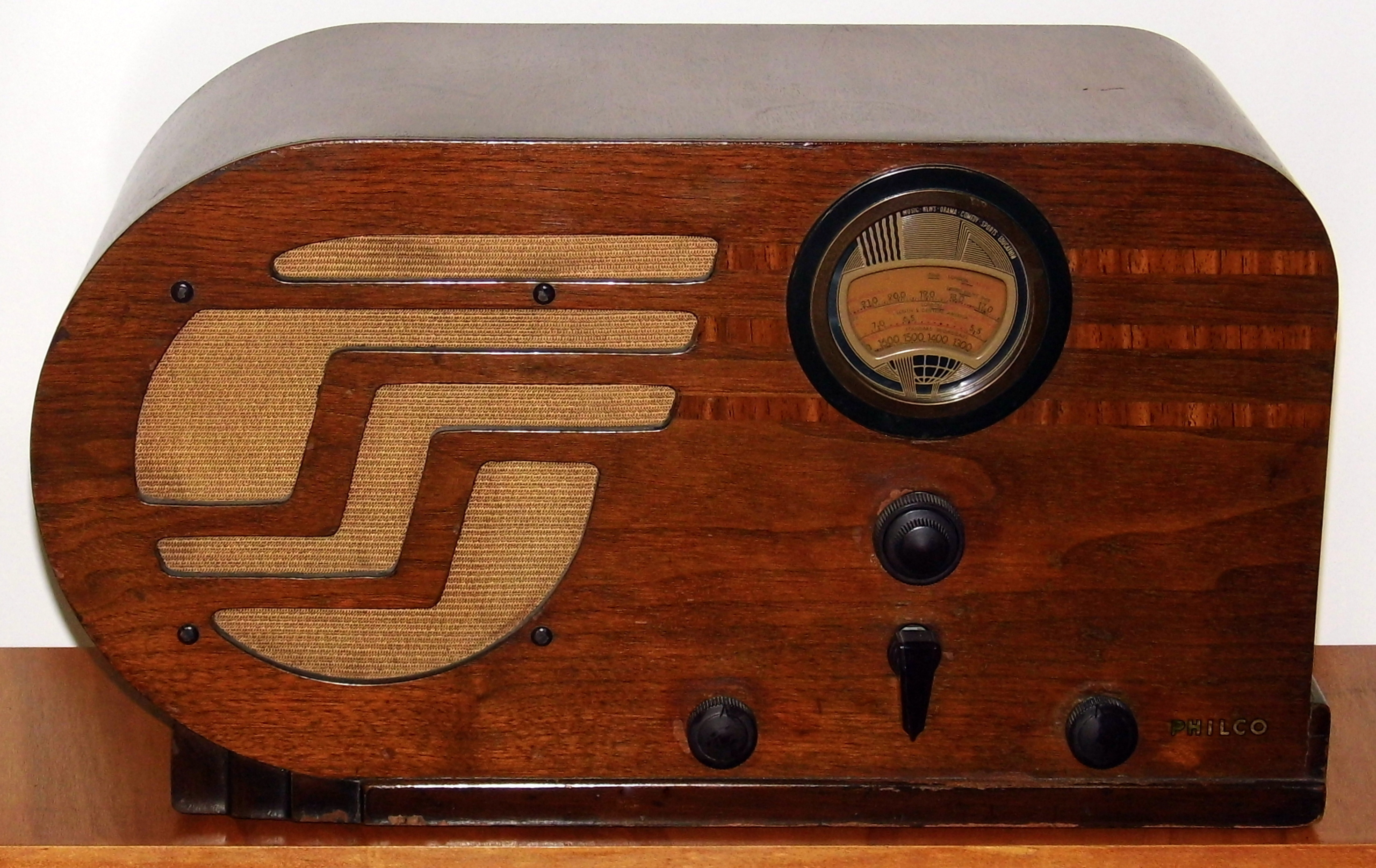
Philco table radio (c. 1937)

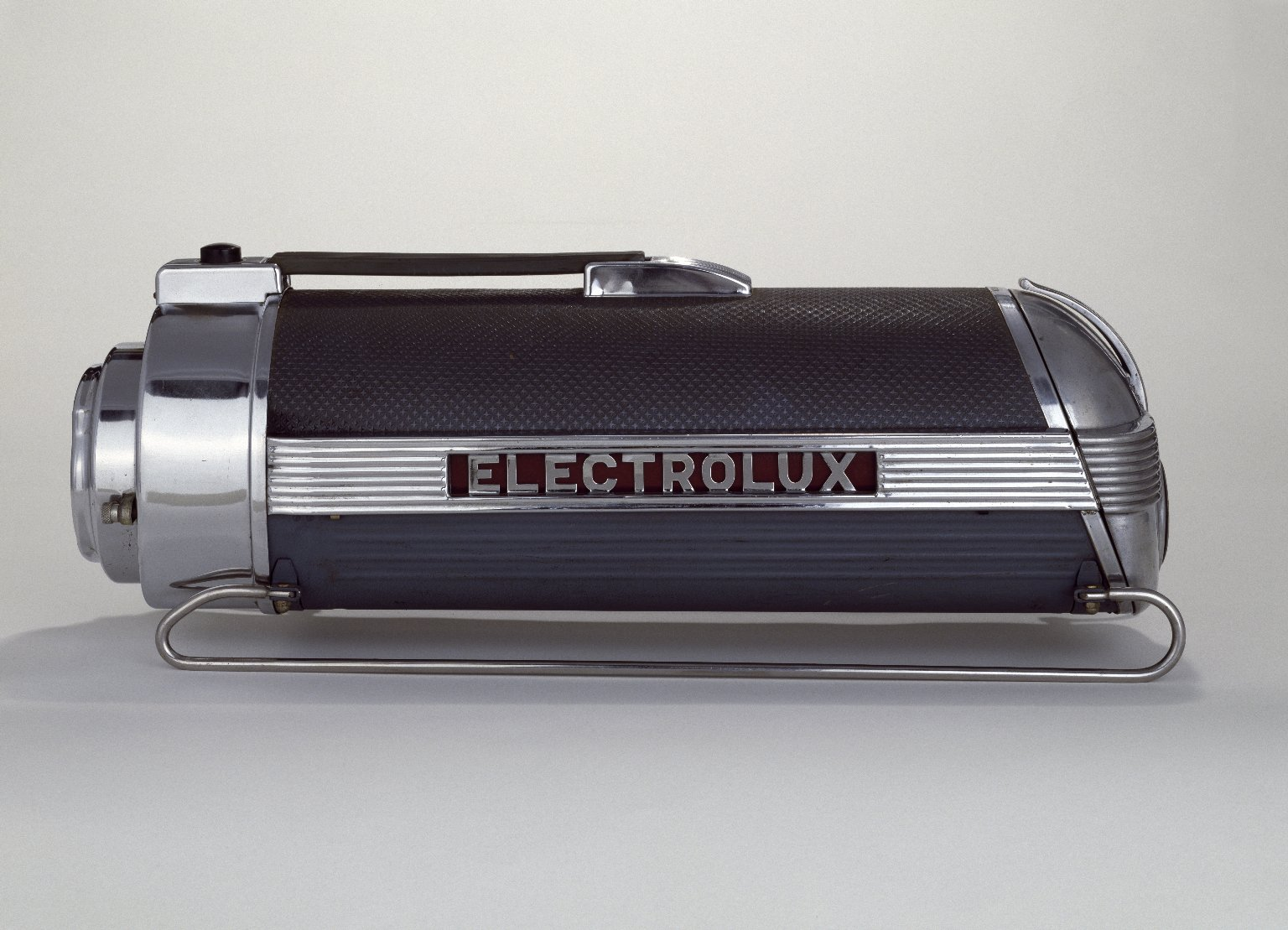
Electrolux vacuum cleaner (1937)

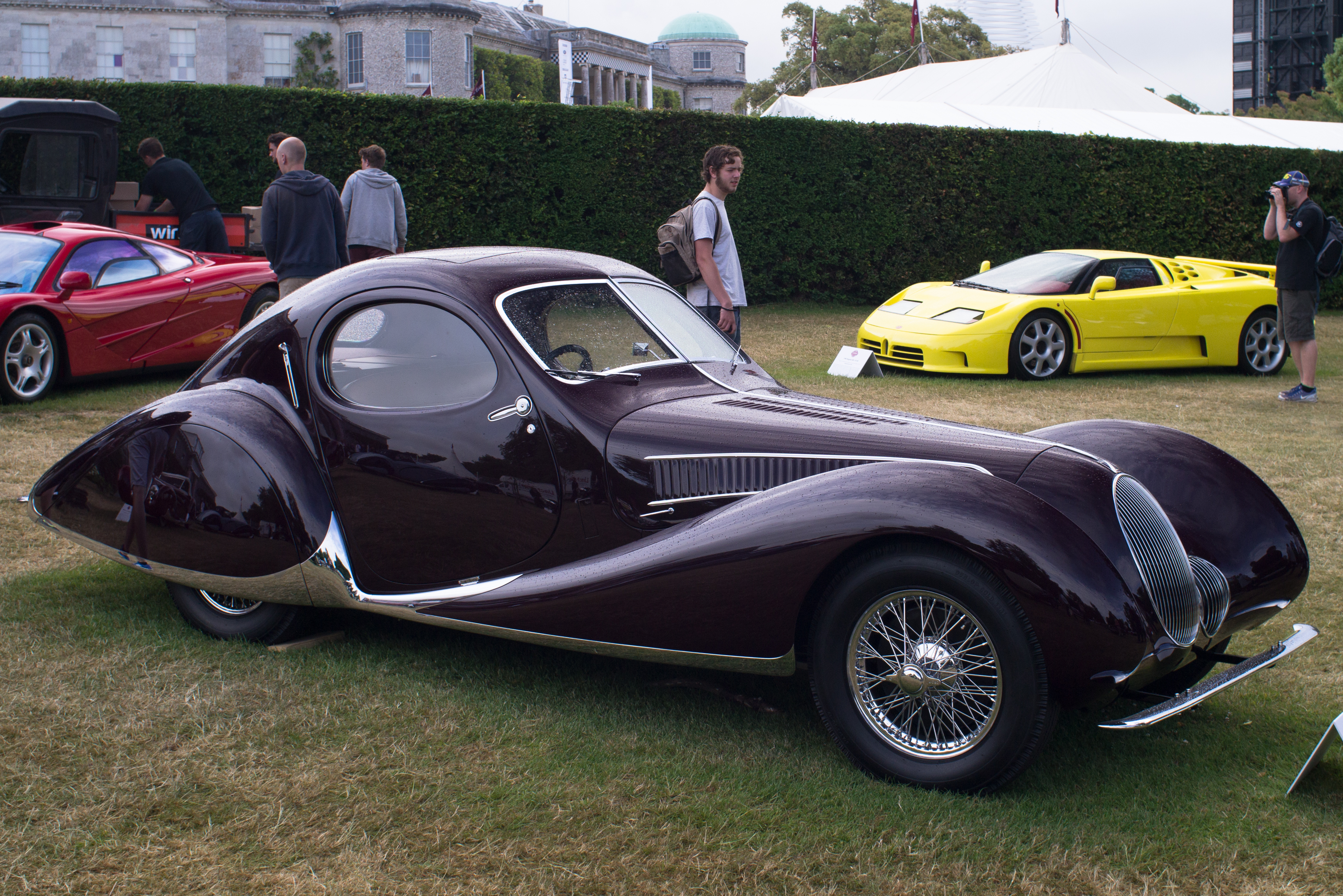
Talbot-Lago T150-C SS 'Goutte d'Eau' by Figoni et Falaschi (1937)

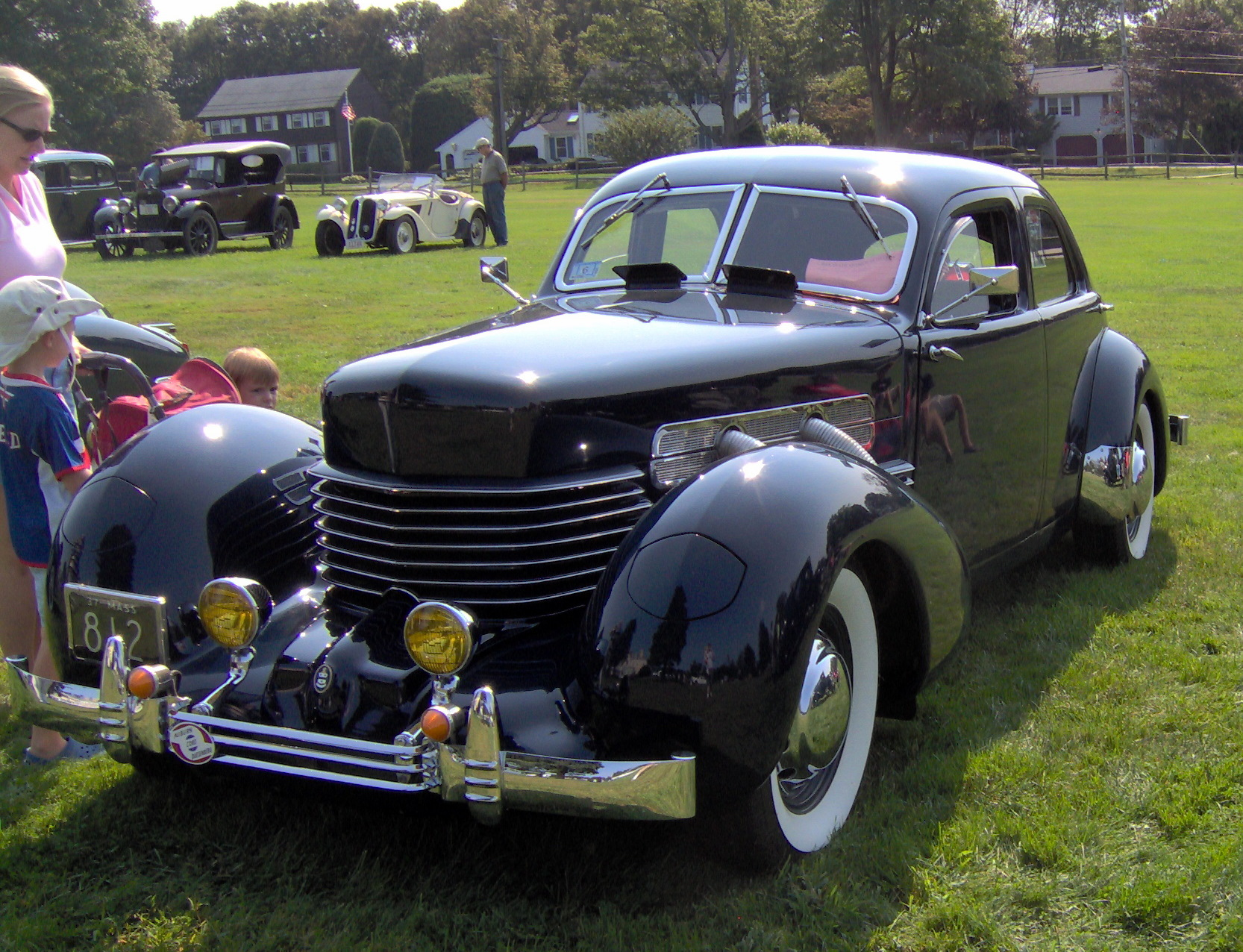
Cord 812, designed by Gordon M. Buehrig (1937)

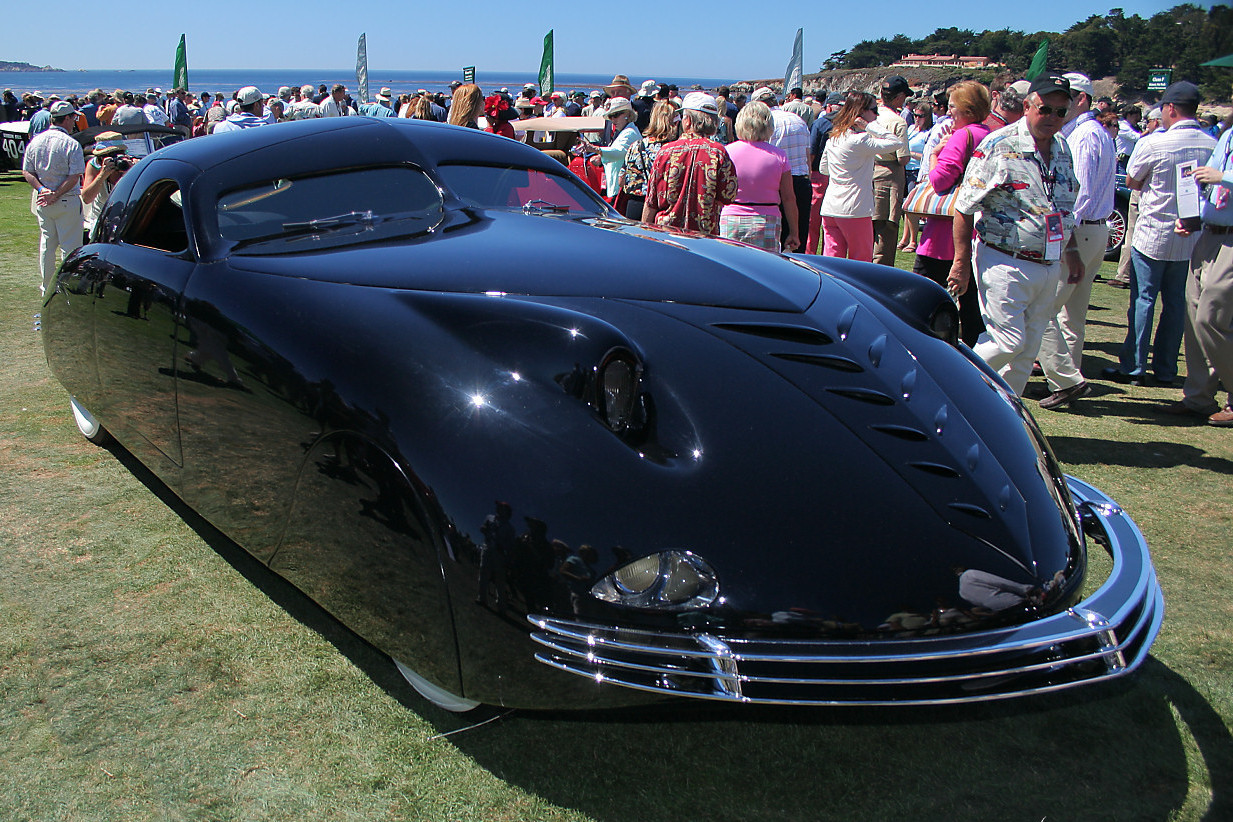
Phantom Corsair, designed by Rust Heinz (1938)

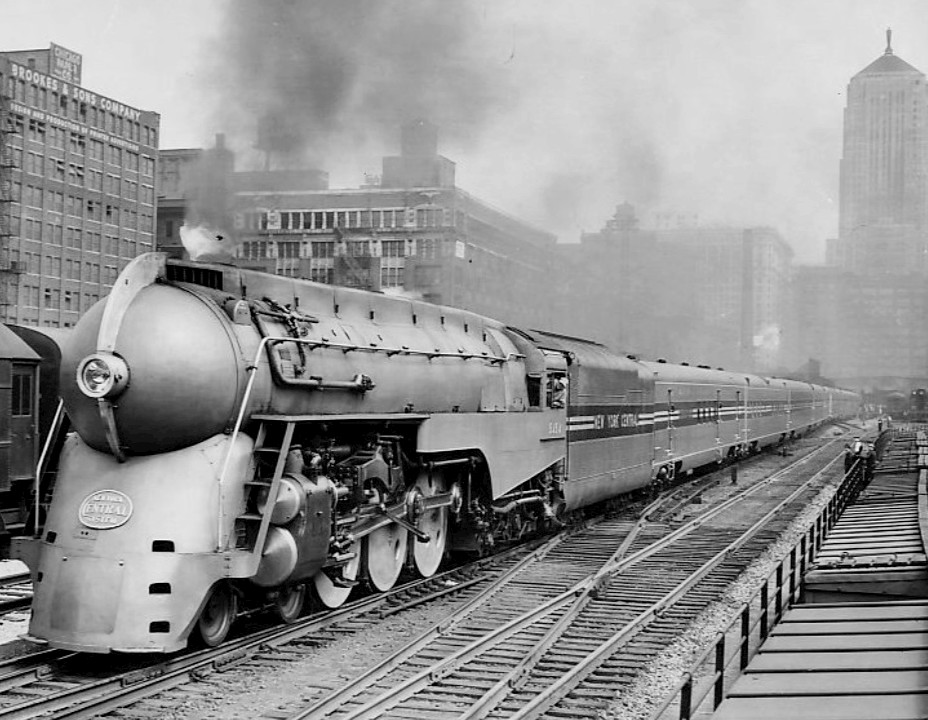
New York Central's 20th Century Limited Hudson 4-6-4 Streamlined locomotive (c. 1939)

Streamline was a variety of Art Deco which emerged during the mid-1930s. It was influenced by modern aerodynamic principles developed for aviation and ballistics to reduce aerodynamic drag at high velocities. The bullet shapes were applied by designers to cars, trains, ships, and even objects not intended to move, such as refrigerators, gas pumps, and buildings. One of the first production vehicles in this style was the Chrysler Airflow of 1933. It was unsuccessful commercially, but the beauty and functionality of its design set a precedent; meant modernity. It continued to be used in car design well after World War II.

New industrial materials began to influence the design of cars and household objects. These included aluminium, chrome, and bakelite, an early form of plastic. Bakelite could be easily moulded into different forms, and soon was used in telephones, radios and other appliances.

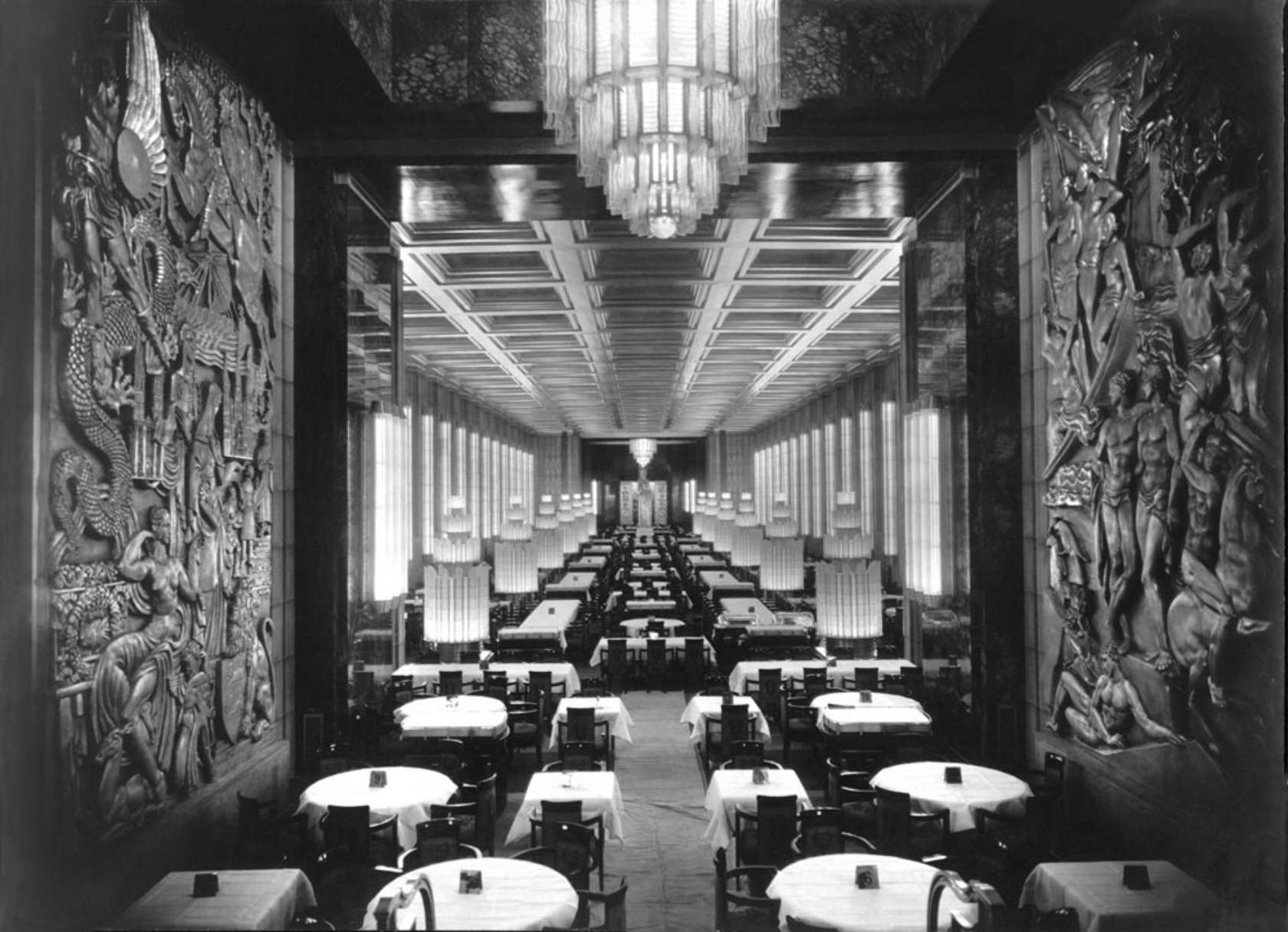
Grand dining room of the ocean liner SS Normandie by Pierre Patout (1935); bas-reliefs by Raymond Delamarre

Ocean liners also adopted a style of Art Deco, known in French as the Style Paquebot, or "Ocean Liner Style". The most famous example was the SS Normandie, which made its first transatlantic trip in 1935. It was designed particularly to bring wealthy Americans to Paris to shop. The cabins and salons featured the latest Art Deco furnishings and decoration. The Grand Salon of the ship, which was the restaurant for first-class passengers, was bigger than the Hall of Mirrors of the Palace of Versailles. It was illuminated by electric lights within twelve pillars of Lalique crystal; thirty-six matching pillars lined the walls. This was one of the earliest examples of illumination being directly integrated into architecture. The style of ships was soon adapted to buildings. A notable example is found on the San Francisco waterfront, where the Maritime Museum building, built as a public bath in 1937, resembles a ferryboat, with ship railings and rounded corners. The Star Ferry Terminal in Hong Kong also used a variation of the style.

== Textiles ==
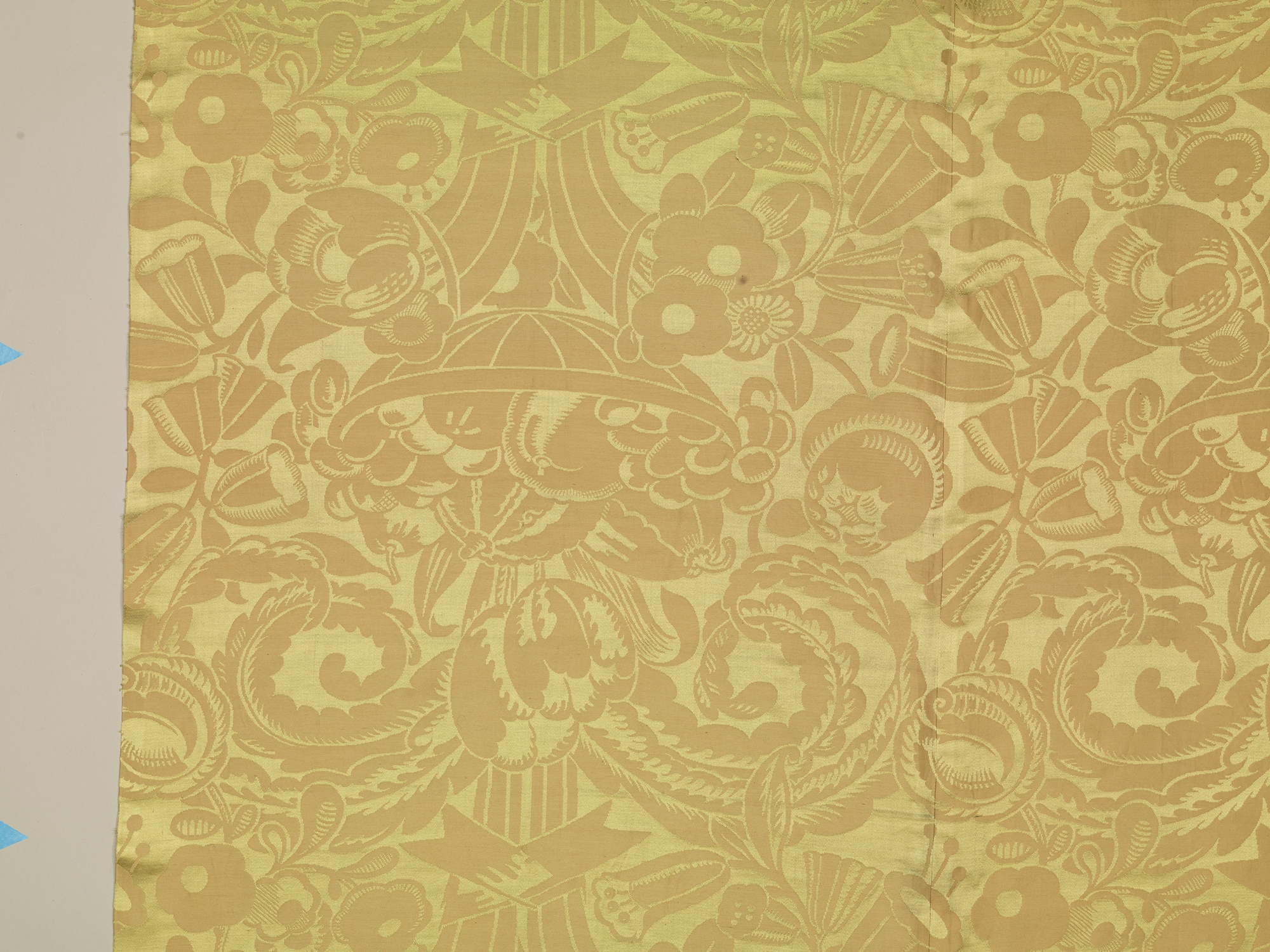
Abundance textile design by André Mare (1911), Metropolitan Museum of Art, New York City

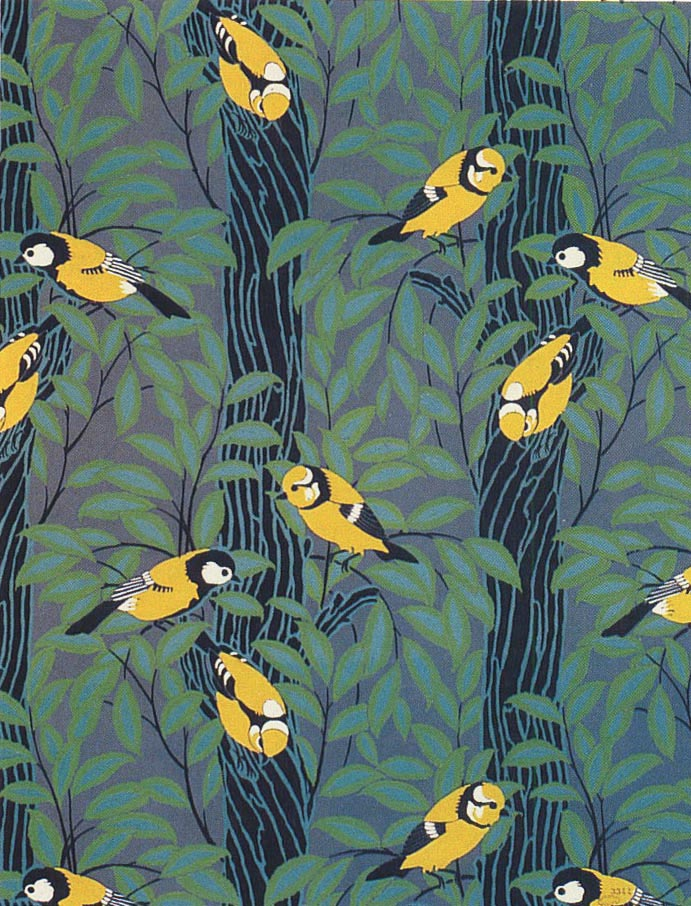
Design of birds from Les Ateliers de Martine by Paul Iribe (1918)

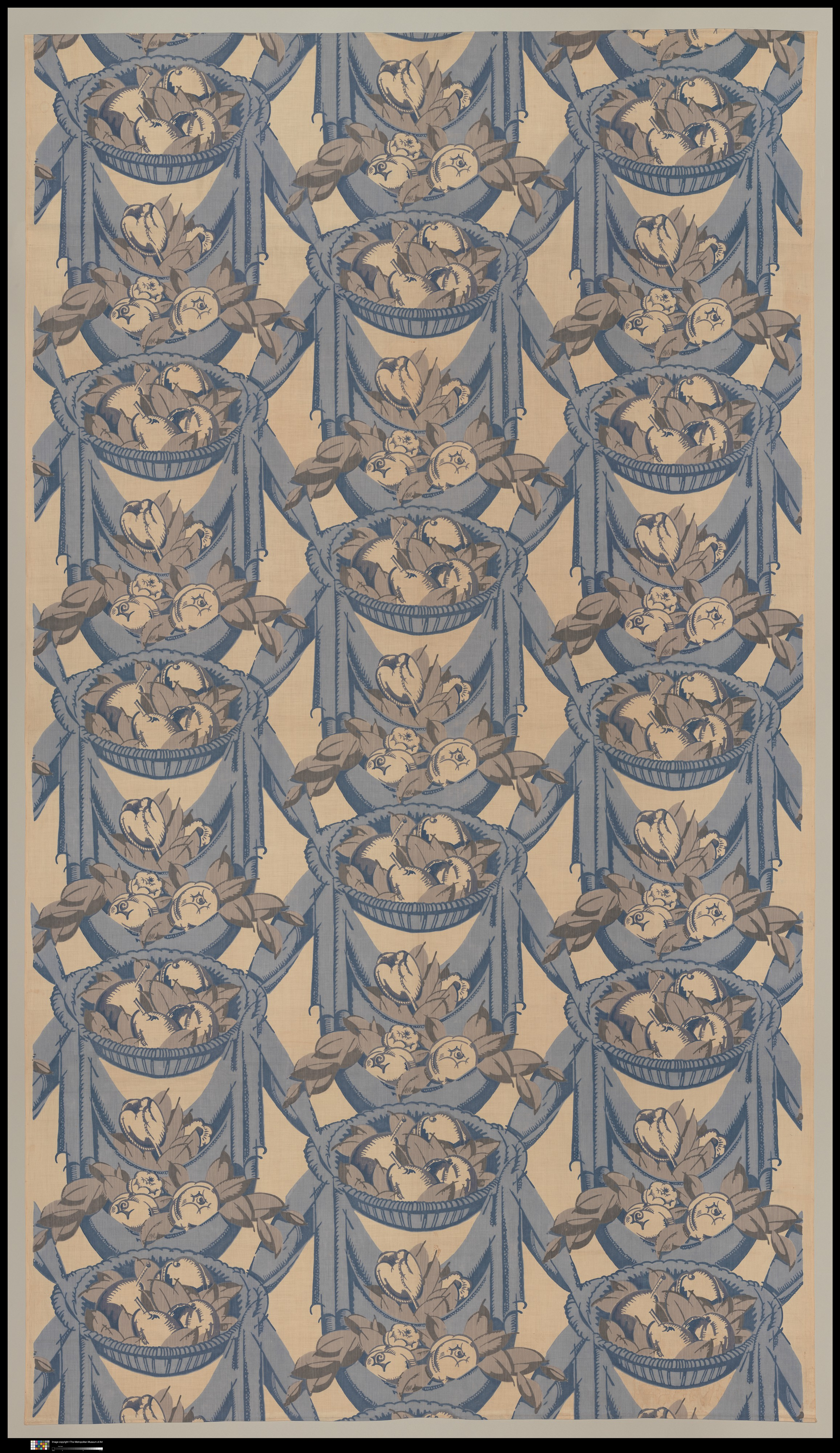
Rose pattern textiles designed by Mare (c. 1919), Metropolitan Museum of Art

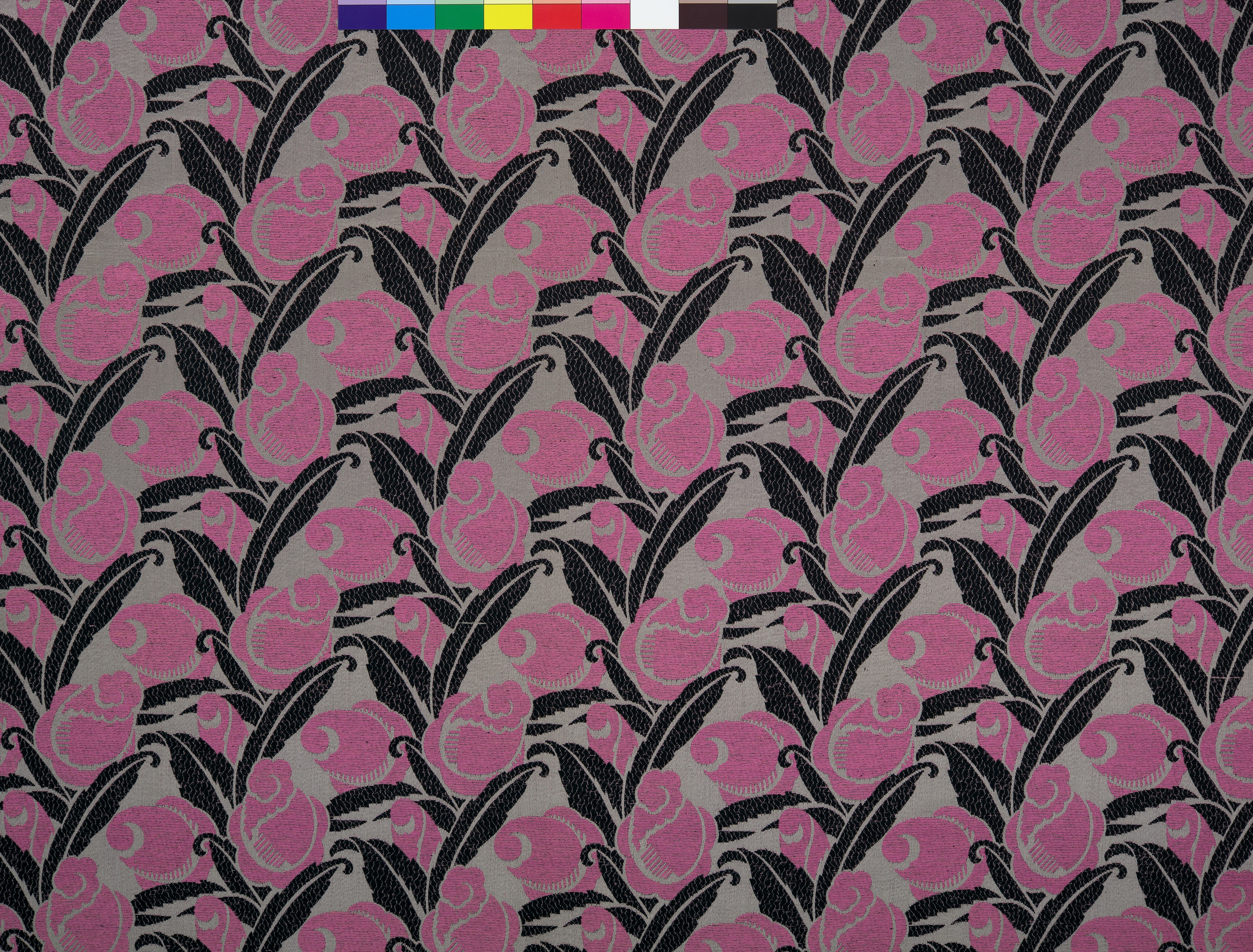
Rose Mousse pattern for upholstery, cotton and silk (1920), Metropolitan Museum of Art

Textiles were an important part of the Art Deco style, in the form of colourful wallpaper, upholstery and carpets, In the 1920s, designers were inspired by the stage sets of the Ballets Russes, fabric designs and costumes from Léon Bakst and creations by the Wiener Werkstätte. The early interior designs of André Mare featured brightly coloured and highly stylized garlands of roses and flowers, which decorated the walls, floors, and furniture. Stylized Floral motifs also dominated the work of Raoul Dufy and Paul Poiret, and in the furniture designs of J.E. Ruhlmann. The floral carpet was reinvented in Deco style by Paul Poiret.

The use of the style was greatly enhanced by the introduction of the pochoir stencil-based printing system, which allowed designers to achieve crispness of lines and very vivid colours. Art Deco forms appeared in the clothing of Paul Poiret, Charles Worth and Jean Patou. After World War I, exports of clothing and fabrics became one of the most important currency earners of France.

Late Art Deco wallpaper and textiles sometimes featured stylized industrial scenes, cityscapes, locomotives and other modern themes, as well as stylized female figures, metallic finishes and geometric designs.

== Fashion ==
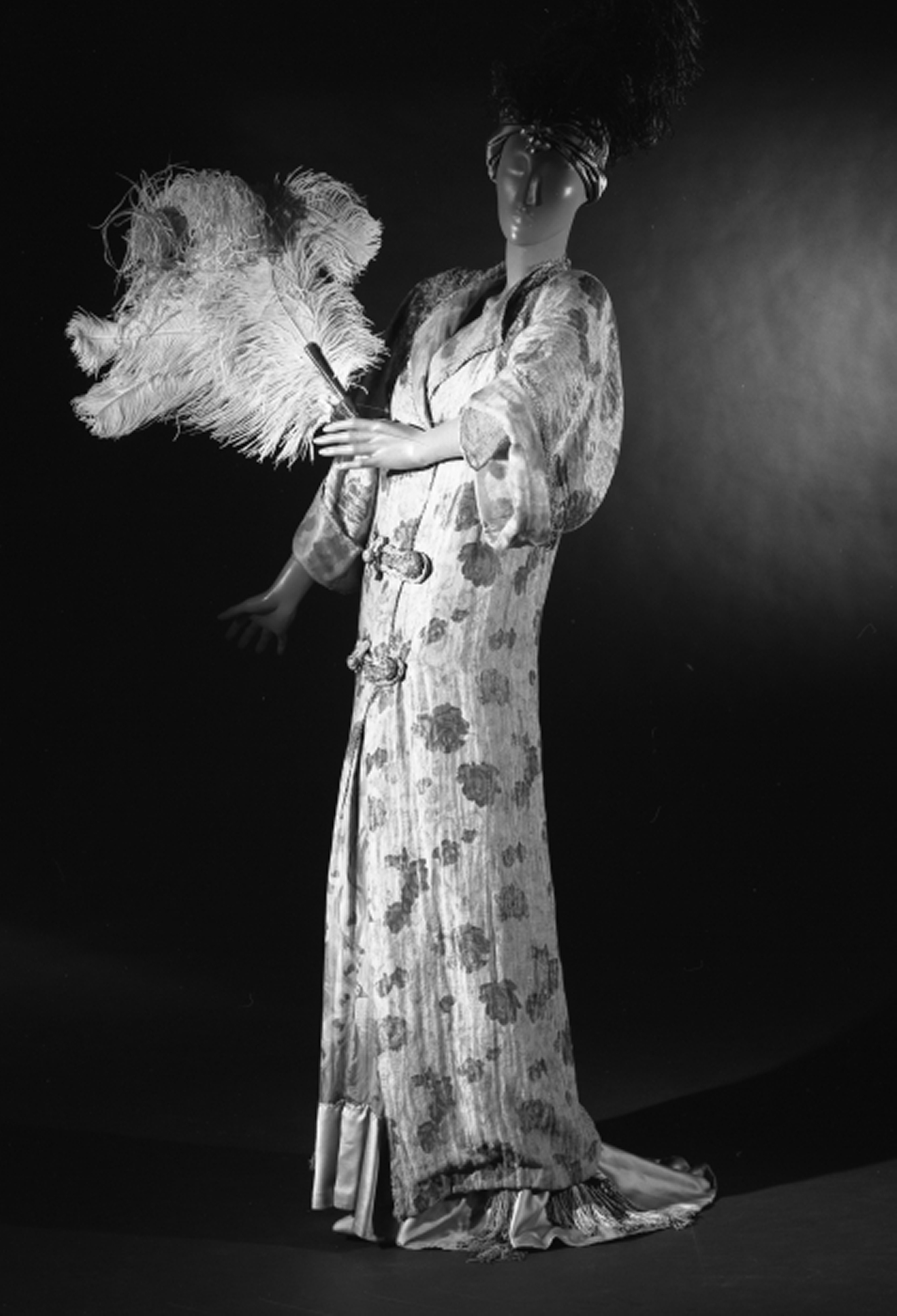
Evening coat by Paul Poiret (c. 1912), silk and metal, Metropolitan Museum of Art, New York City

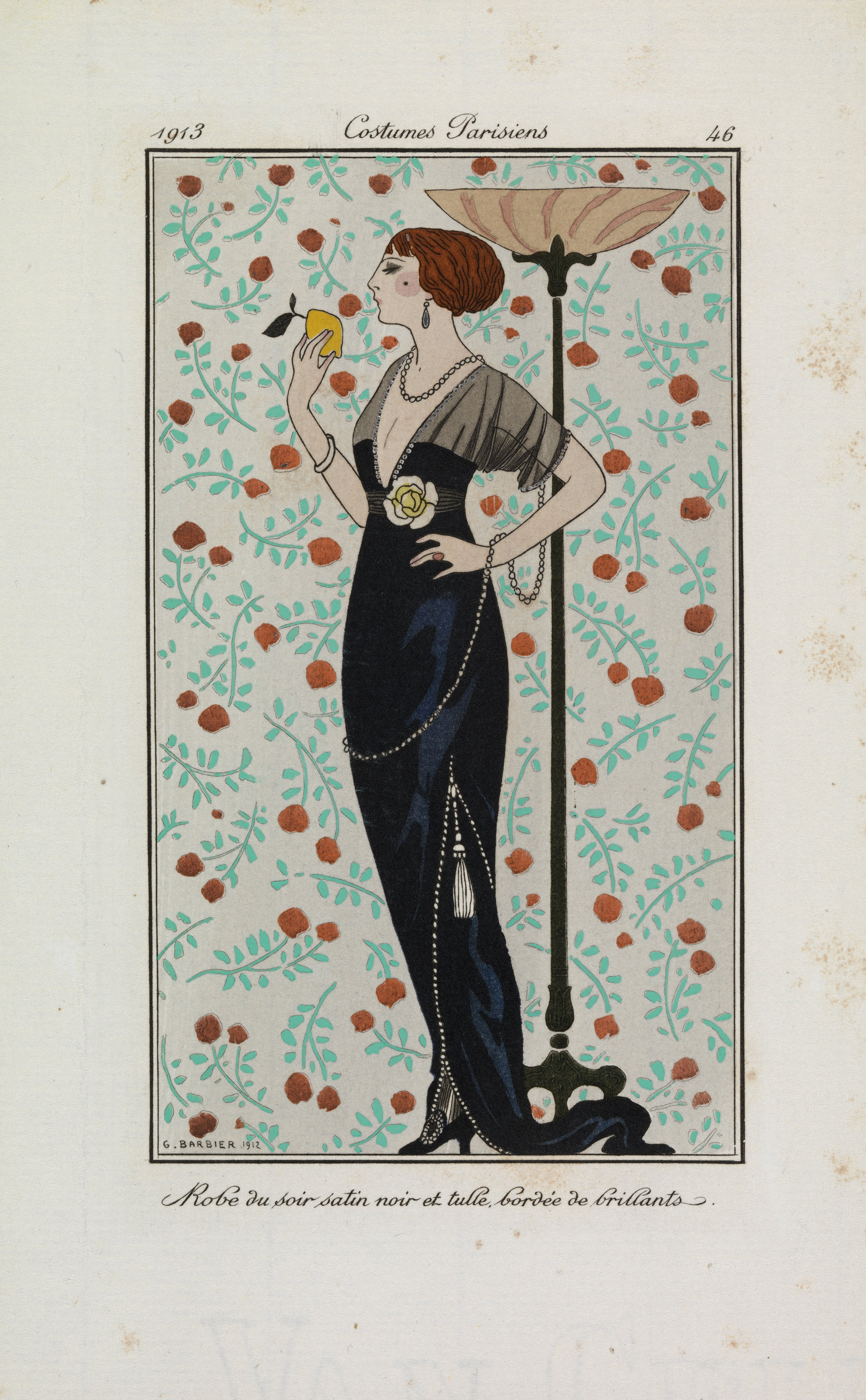
Evening dress from the Journal des Dames et des Modes, illustrated by George Barbier (1913), Chester Beatty Library, Dublin

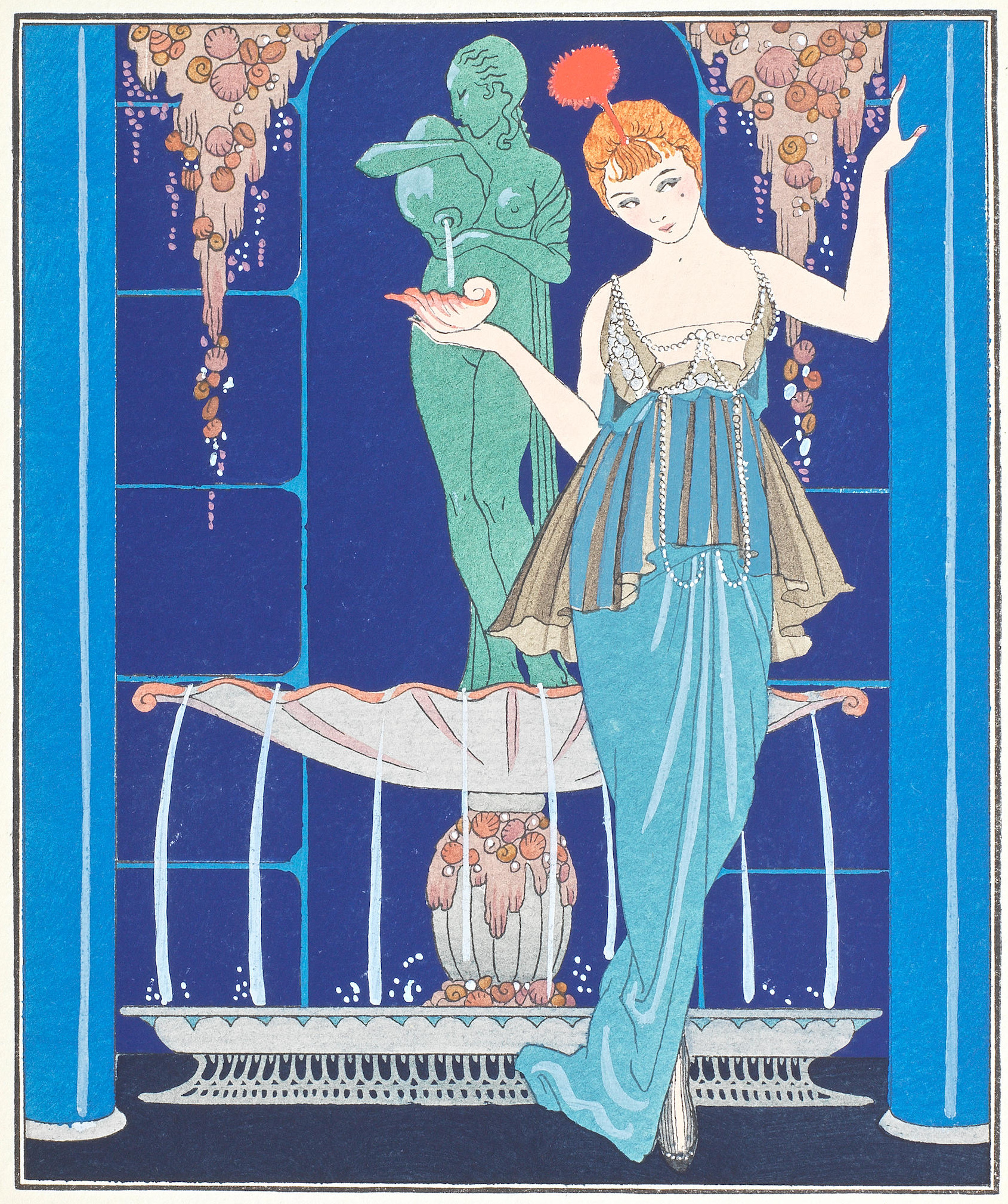
Illustration by Barbier of a gown by Paquin (1914). Stylised floral designs and bright colours were a feature of early Art Deco.

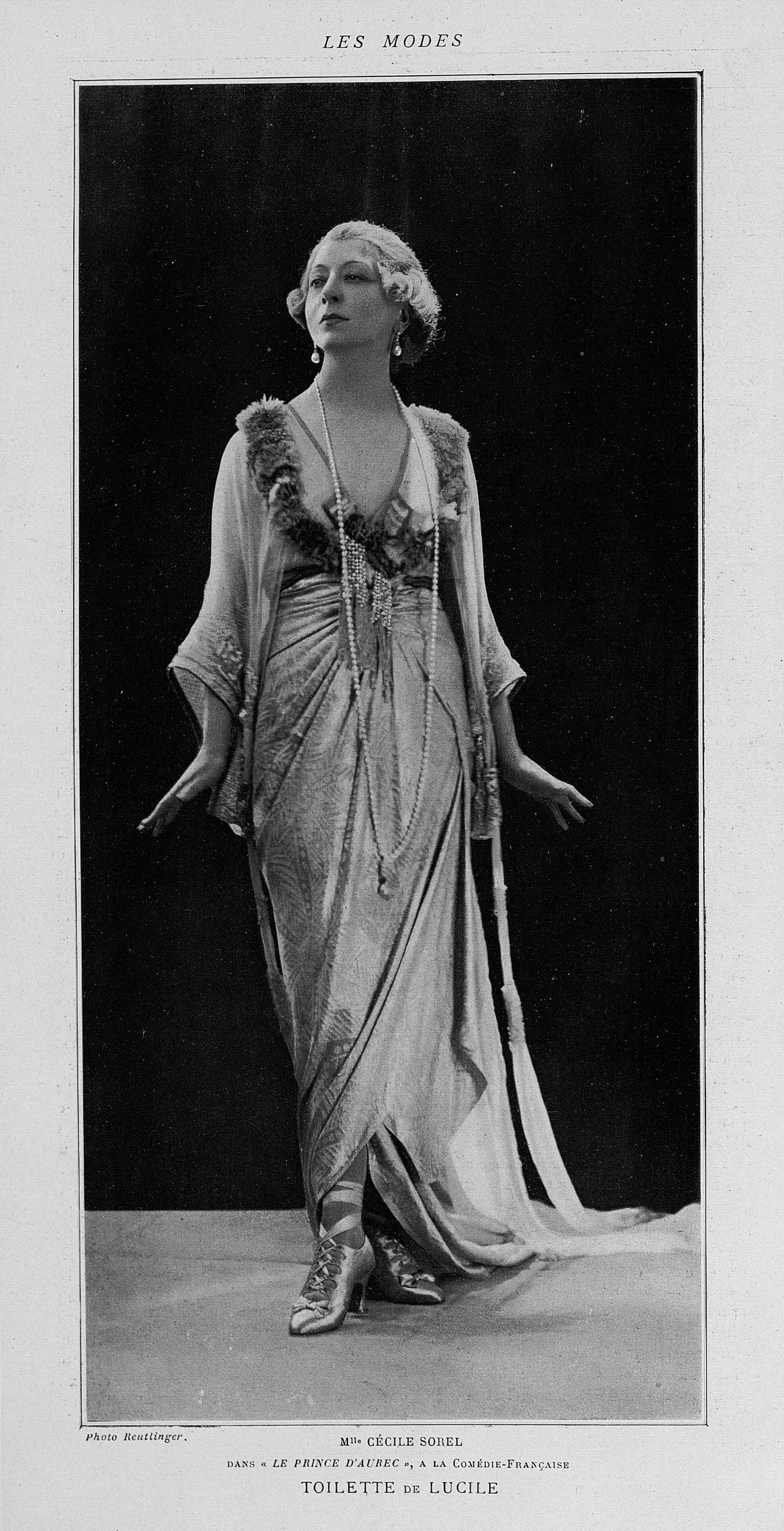
Cécile Sorel at the Comédie-Française (1920)

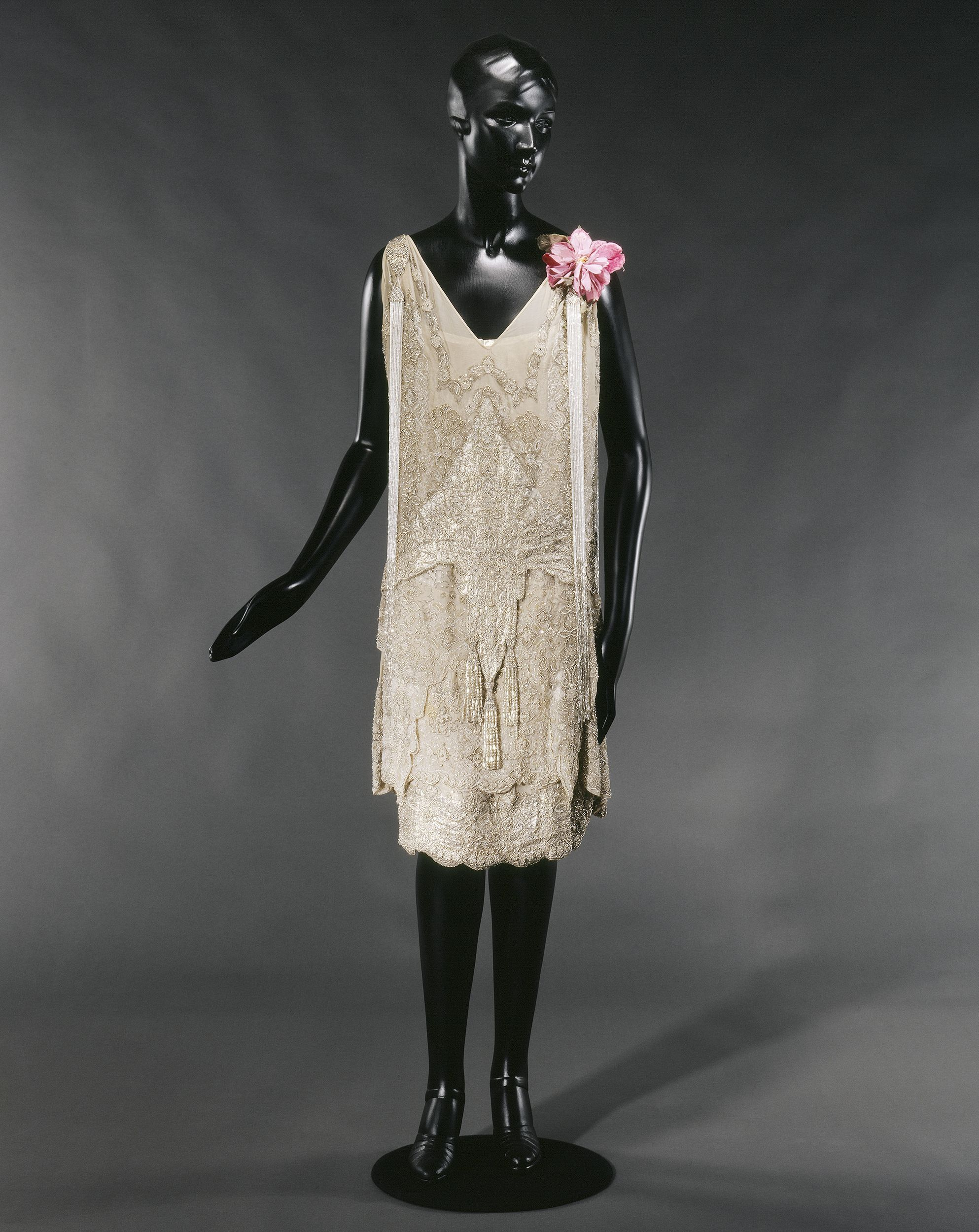
Evening dress by the Maison Agnès (1920–1930), silk, pearls, strass, cabochon, and other materials, Musée Galliera, Paris

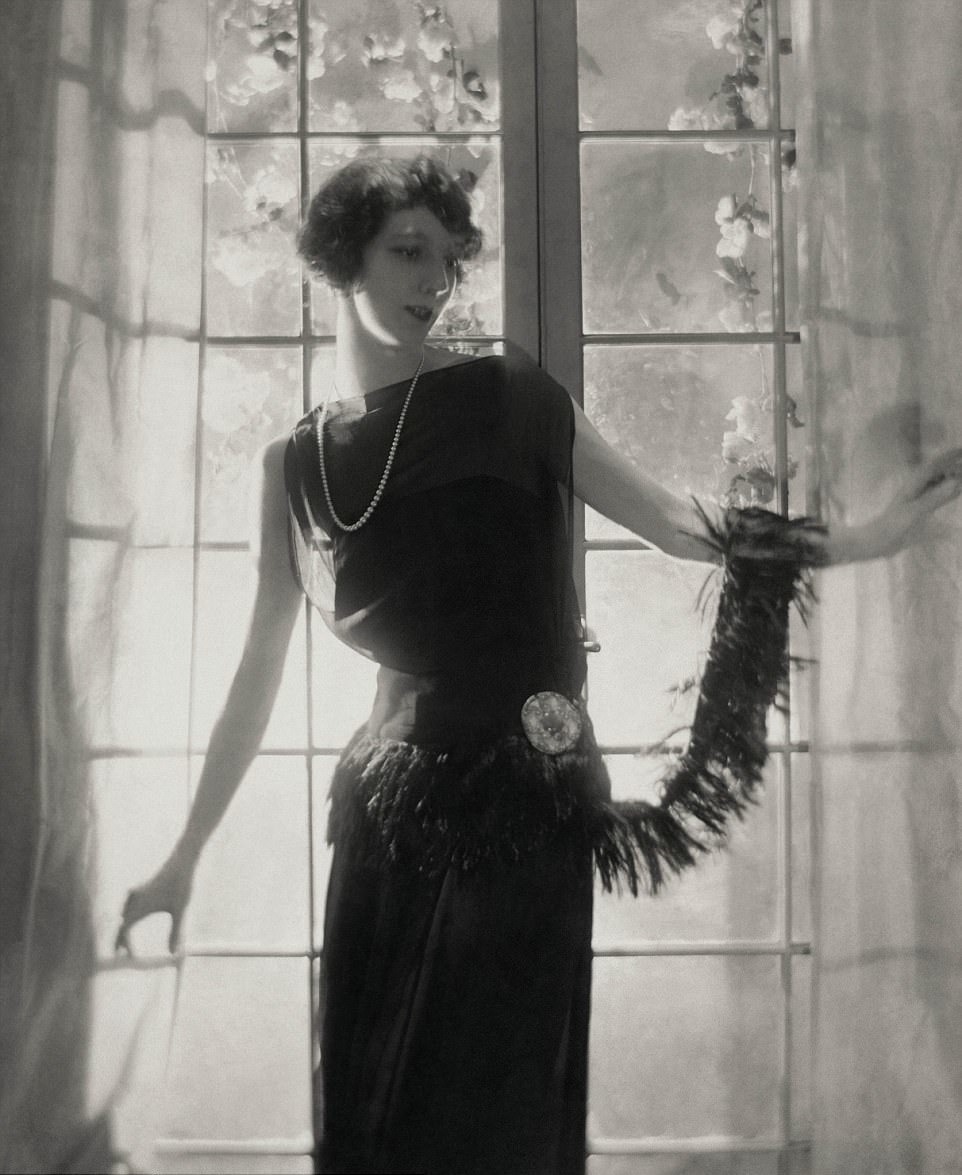
Desiree Lubovska in a dress by Jean Patou (c. 1921)

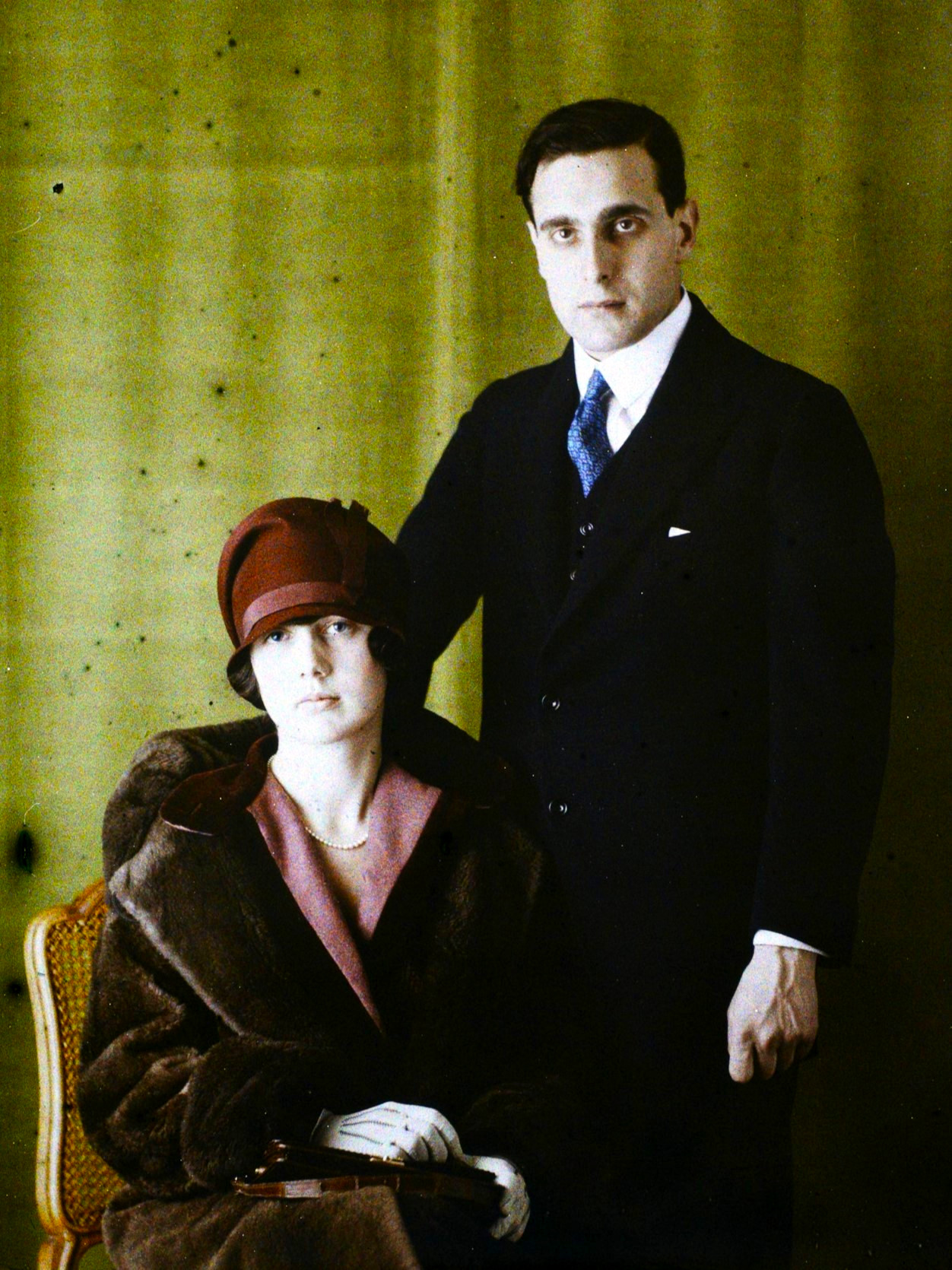
Warburg family photographed using Autochrome Lumière process (1926)

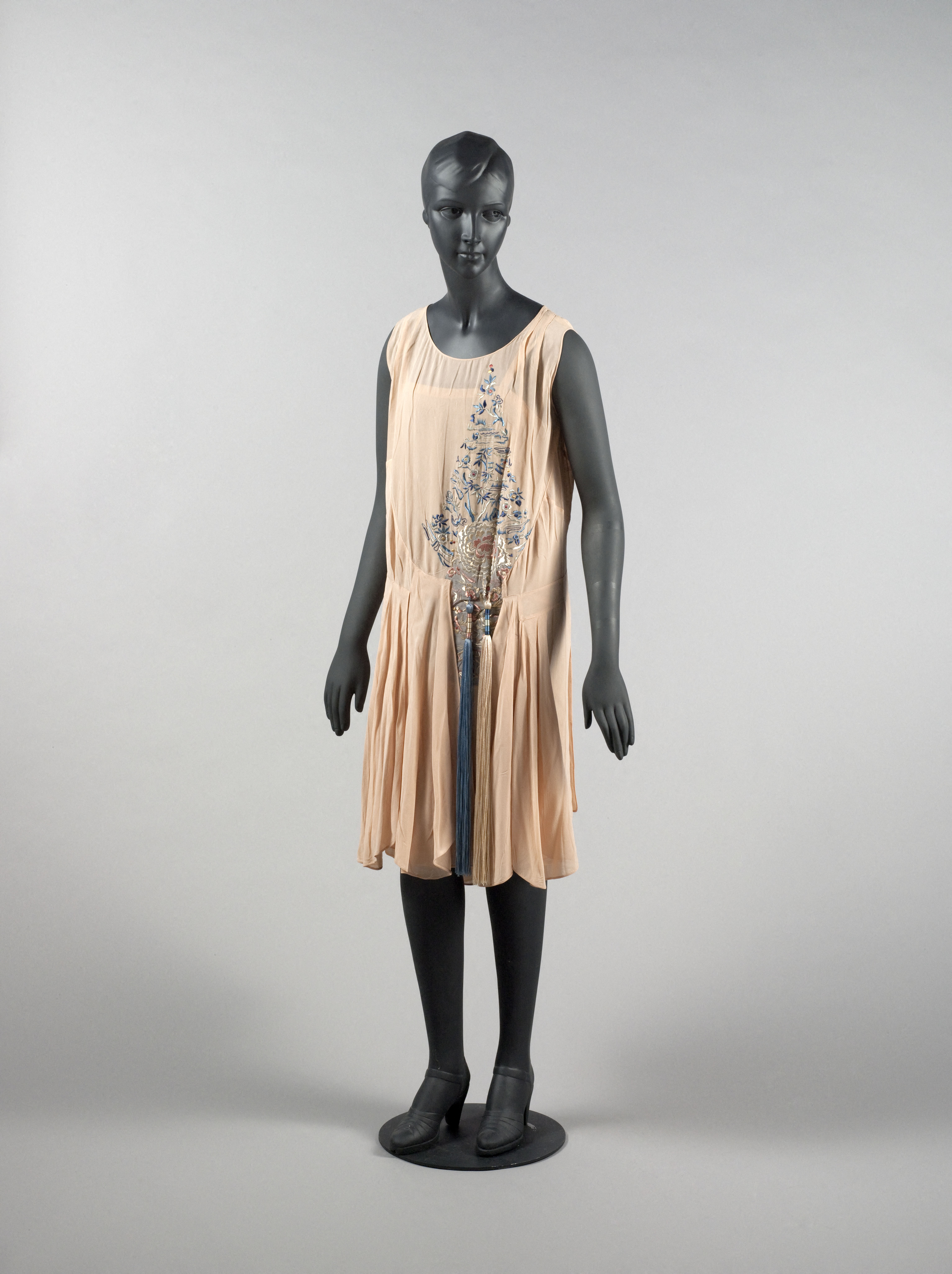
Skirt by the Maison Agnès (1925–1927), silk, Musée Galliera

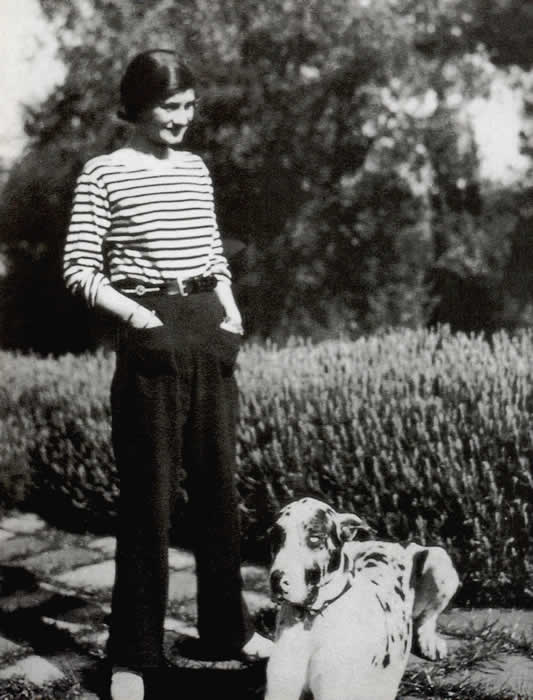
Coco Chanel in a sailor's blouse and trousers (1928)

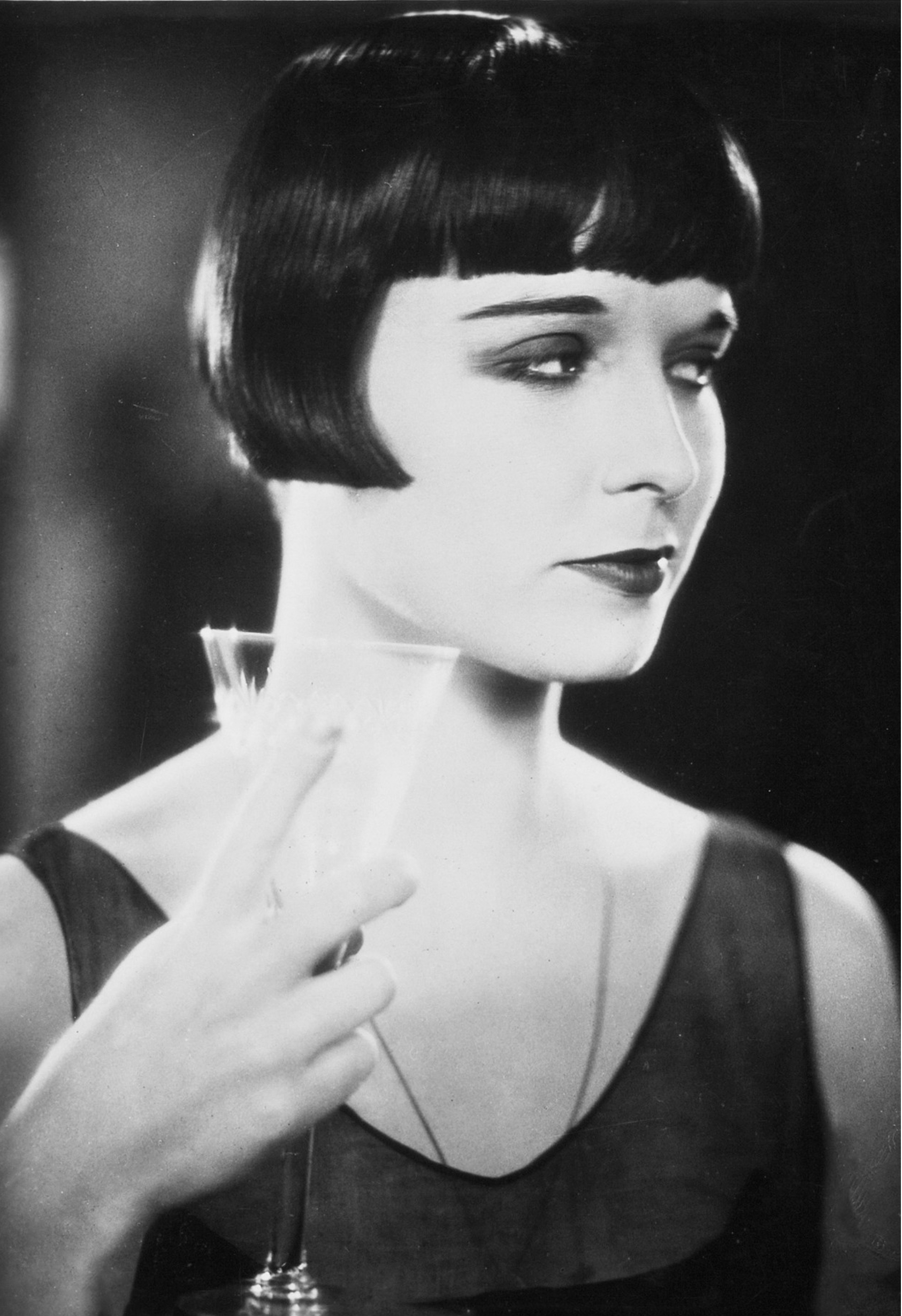
Louise Brooks with an à la garçonne hairstyle, in a publicity photo for Diary of Lost Girl (1929)

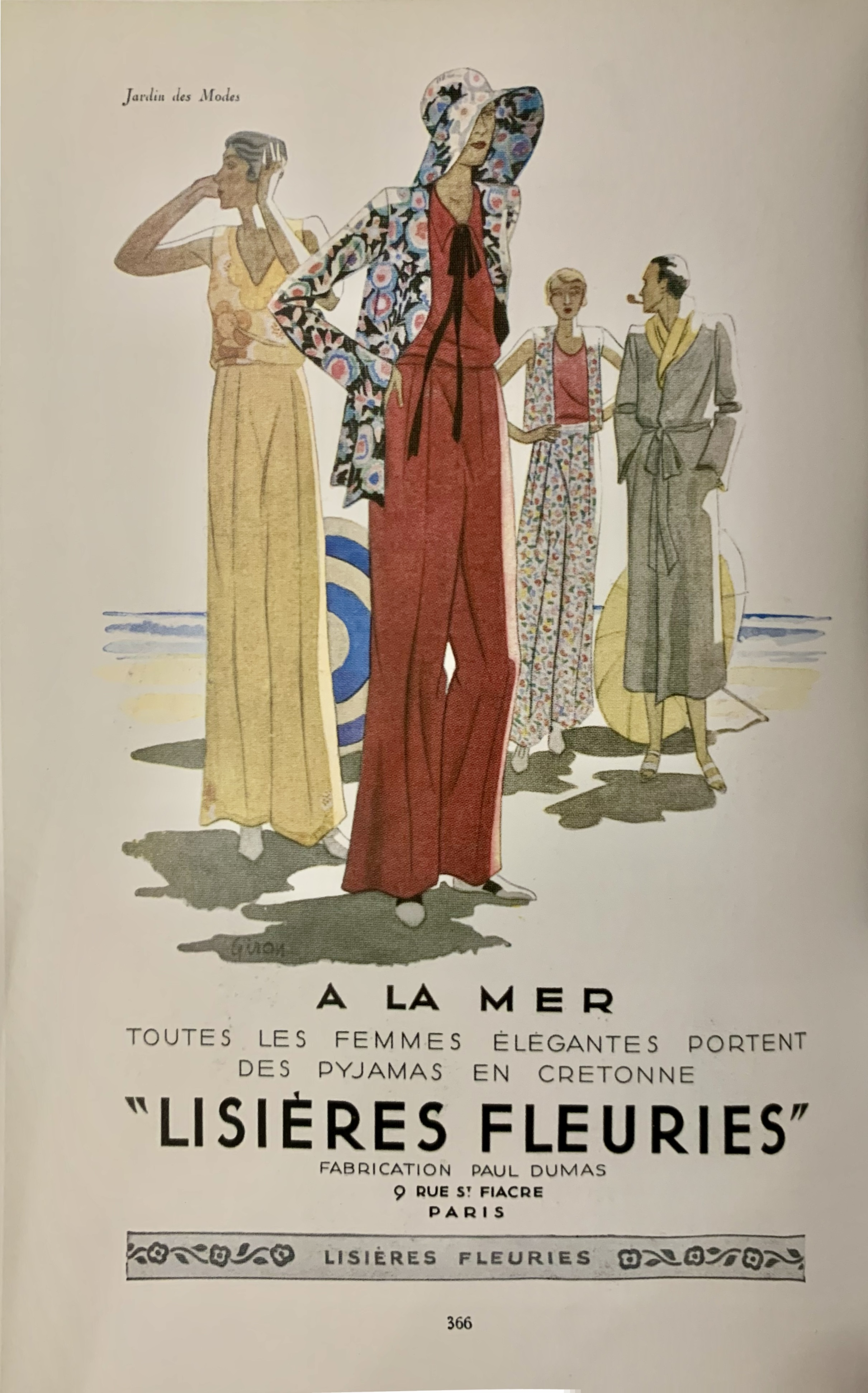
Advertisement for pyjamas in Lisières Fleuries fabric, from Le Jardin des Modes (1930)

Fashion changed dramatically during this period, thanks in particular to designers Paul Poiret and later Coco Chanel. Poiret introduced the concept of draping, a departure from the tailoring and patternmaking of the past. He designed clothing cut along straight lines and constructed of rectangular motifs. His styles offered structural simplicity The corseted look and formal styles of the previous period were abandoned, and fashion became more practical, and streamlined. With the use of new materials, brighter colours and printed designs. The designer Coco Chanel continued the transition, popularising the style of sporty, casual chic.

A particular typology of the era was the Flapper, a woman who cut her hair into a short bob, drank cocktails, smoked in public, and danced late into the night at fashionable clubs, cabarets or bohemian dives. Of course, most women didn't live like this, the Flapper being more a character present in popular imagination than a reality. Another female Art Deco style was the androgynous garçonne of the 1920s, with flattened bosom, dispelled waist and revealed legs, reducing the silhouette to a short tube, topped with a head-hugging cloche hat.

== Jewelry ==
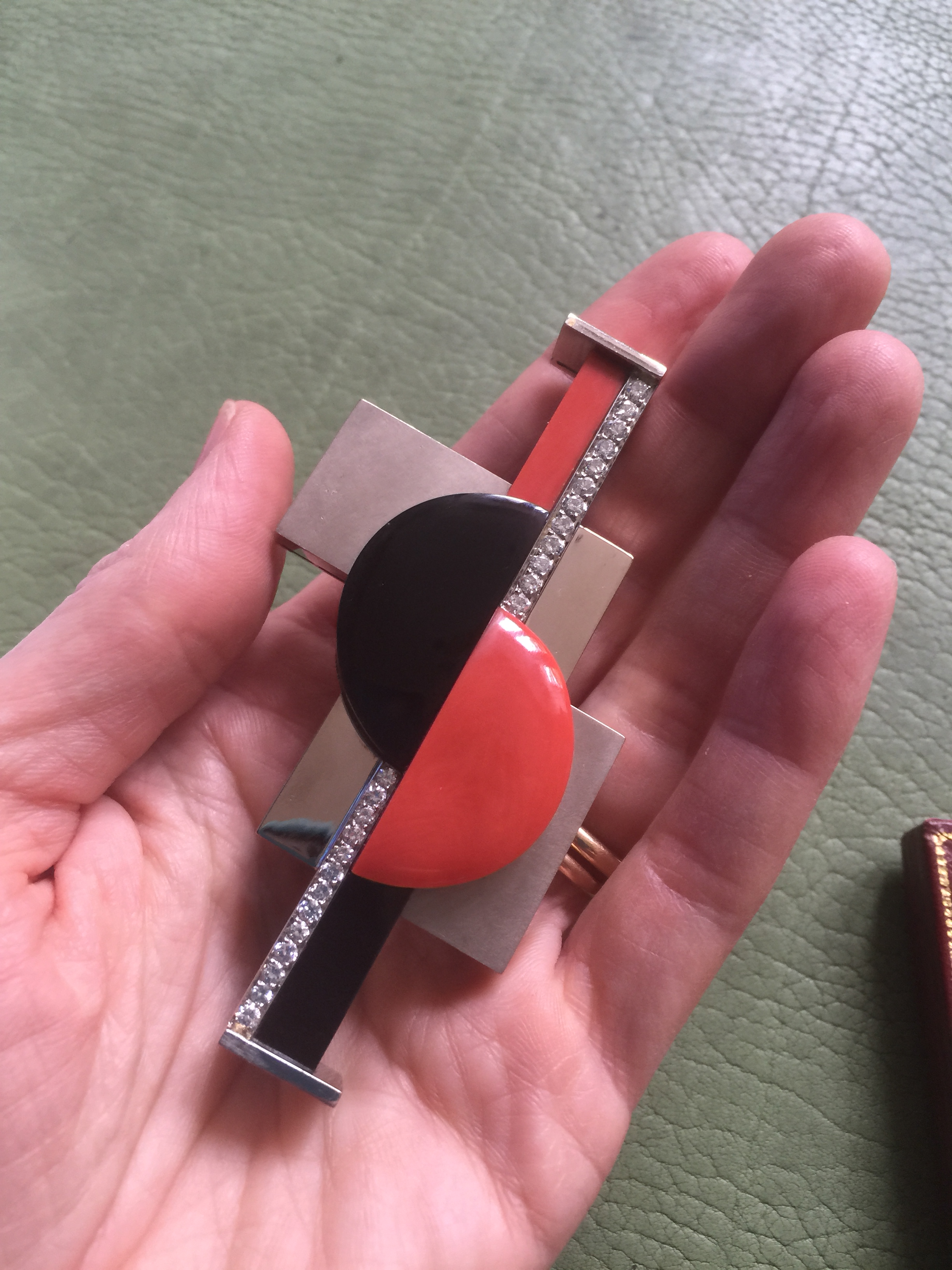
Semaphore brooch by Gerard Sandoz, in platinum, coral, onyx, diamonds, 1925

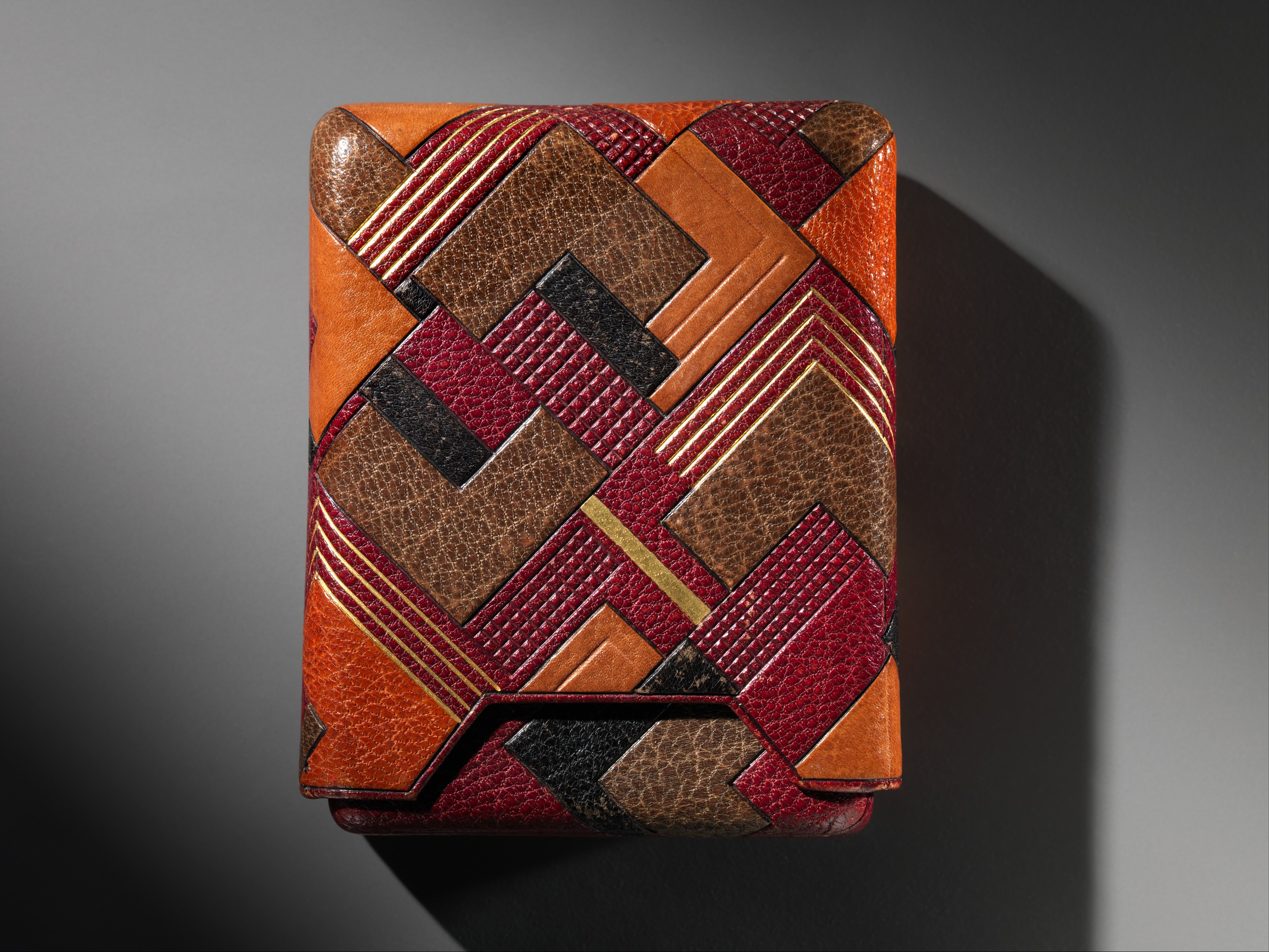
Cigarette case of leather and gold leaf by Pierre Legrain (1922), presenting a polychrome geometric decoration, Metropolitan Museum of Art, New York City

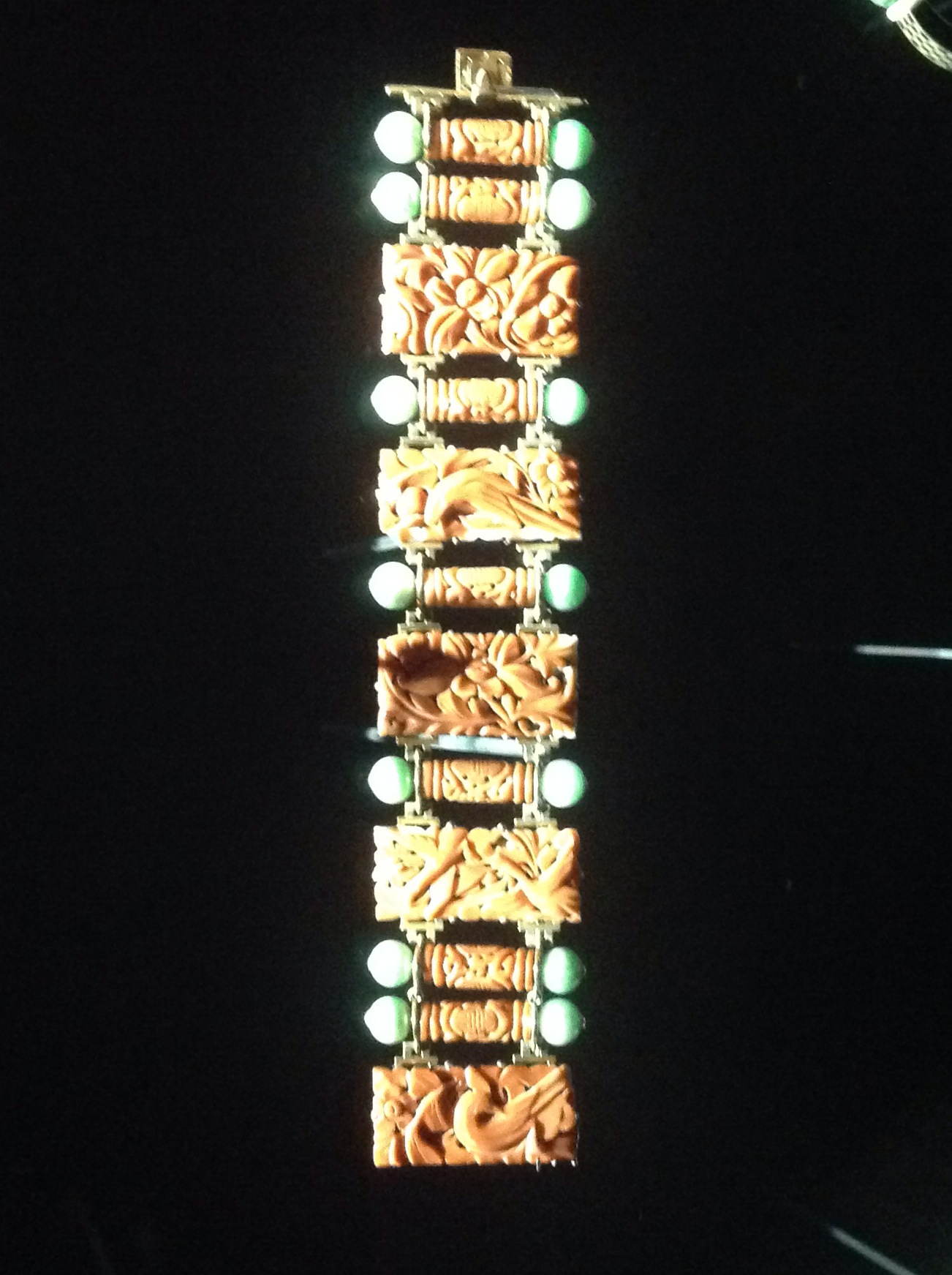
Bracelet of gold, coral and jade (1925), Museum of Decorative Arts, Paris

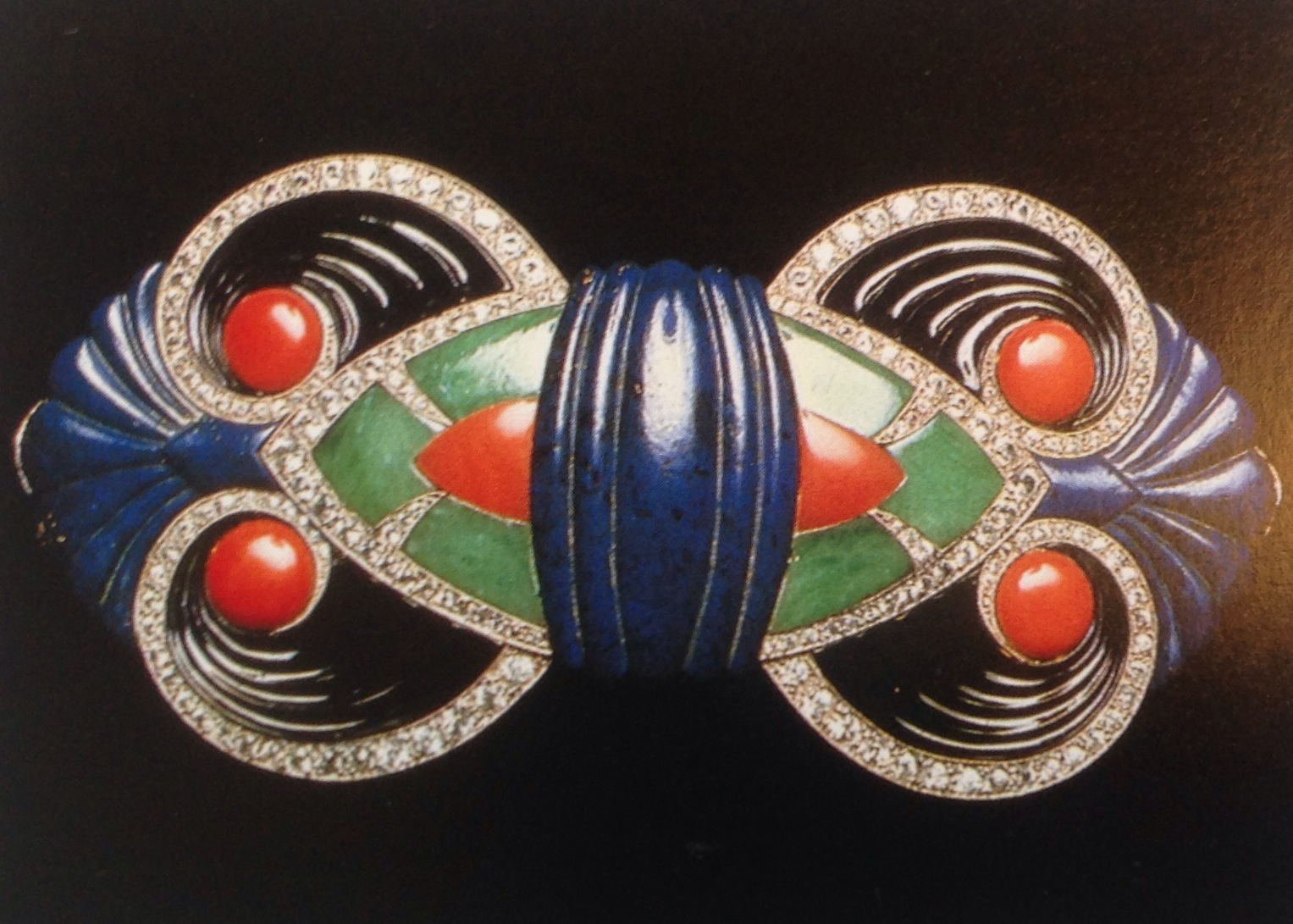
Gold buckle set with diamonds and carved onyx, lapis lazuli, jade, and coral, by Boucheron (1925)

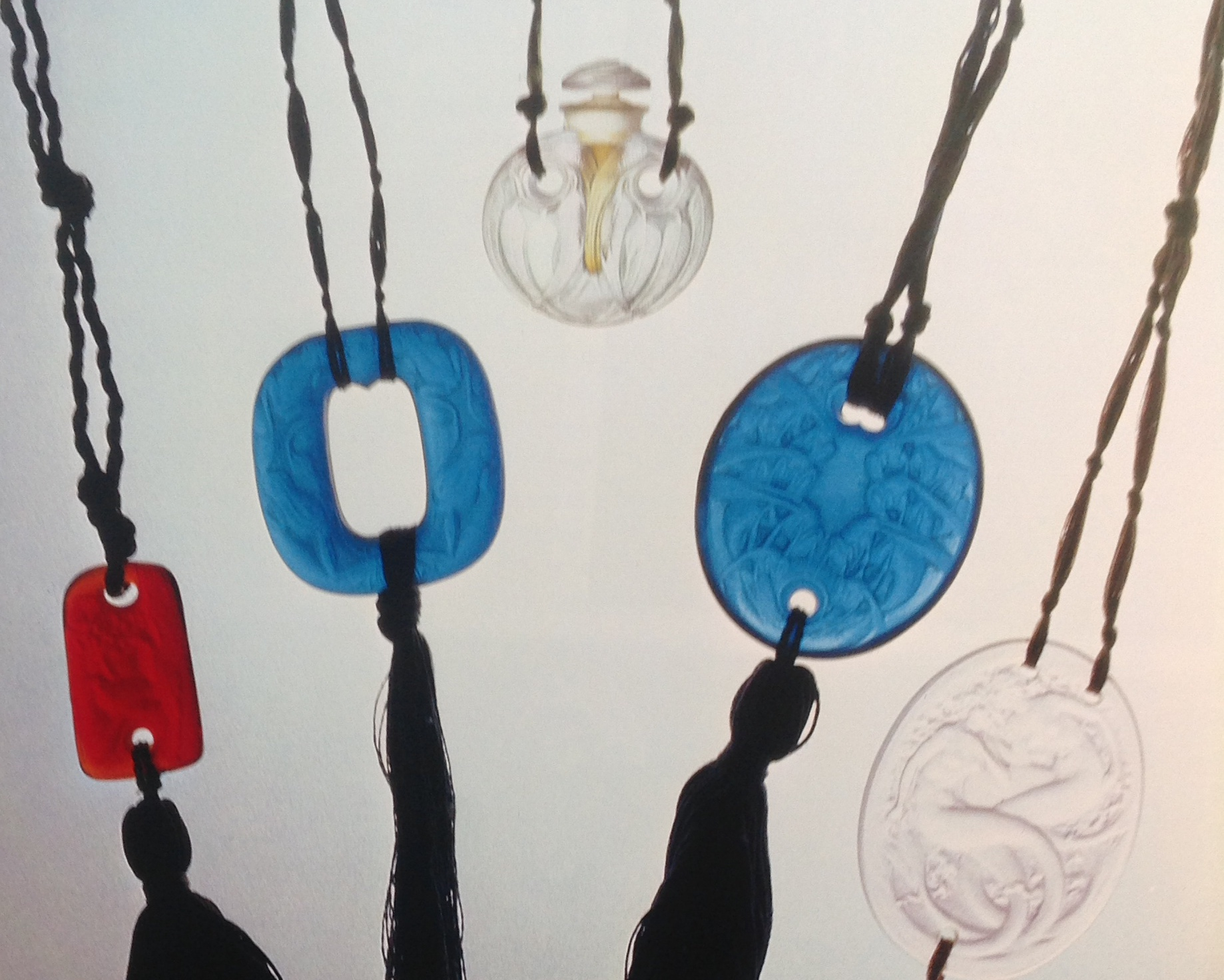
Molded glass pendants on silk cords by René Lalique (1925–1930)

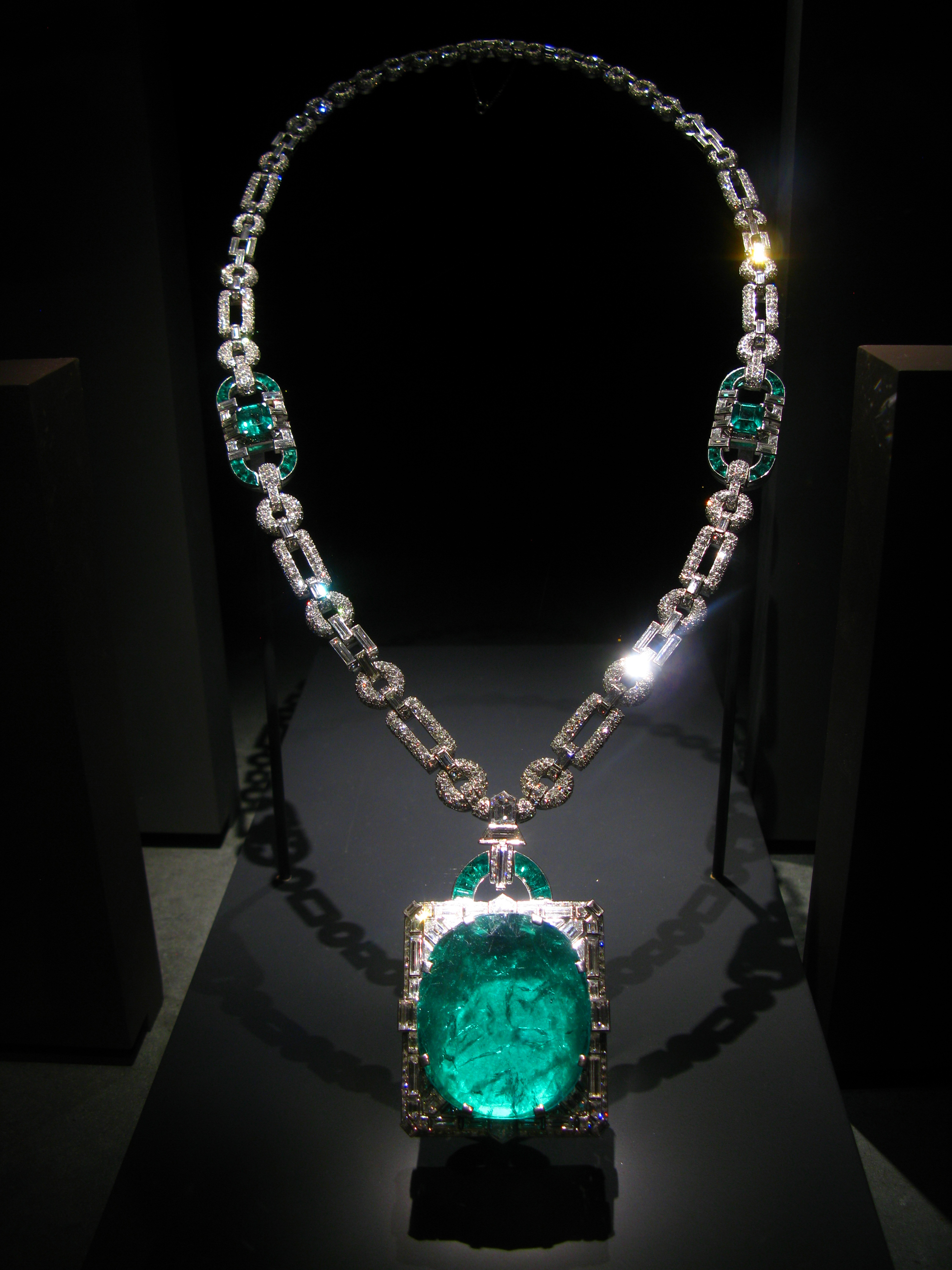
Mackay Emerald Necklace, emerald, diamond and platinum, by Cartier (1930), Smithsonian National Museum of Natural History, Washington, D.C.

In the 1920s and 1930s, designers including René Lalique and Cartier tried to reduce the traditional dominance of diamonds by introducing more colourful gemstones, such as small emeralds, rubies and sapphires. They also placed greater emphasis on very elaborate and elegant settings, featuring less-expensive materials such as enamel, glass, horn and ivory. Diamonds themselves were cut in less traditional forms; the 1925 Exposition saw many diamonds cut in the form of tiny rods or matchsticks. Other popular Art Deco cuts include:

- emerald cut, with long step-cut facets;
- asscher cut, more square-shaped than emerald with a high crown and the first diamond cut to ever be patented;
- marquise cut, to give the illusion of being bigger and bolder;
- baguette cut: small, rectangular step-cut shapes often used to outline bolder stones;
- old European cut, round in shape and cut by hand so sparks of color (called fire) flash from within the stone.

The settings for diamonds also changed; More and more often jewellers used platinum instead of gold, since it was strong and flexible, and could set clusters of stones. Jewellers also began to use more dark materials, such as enamels and black onyx, which provided a higher contrast with diamonds.

Jewellery became much more colourful and varied in style. Cartier and the firm of Boucheron combined diamonds with colourful other gemstones cut into the form of leaves, fruit or flowers, to make brooches, rings, earrings, clips and pendants. Far Eastern themes also became popular; plaques of jade and coral were combined with platinum and diamonds, and vanity cases, cigarette cases and powder boxes were decorated with Japanese and Chinese landscapes made with mother of pearl, enamel and lacquer.

Rapidly changing fashions in clothing brought new styles of jewellery. Sleeveless dresses of the 1920s meant that arms needed decoration, and designers quickly created bracelets of gold, silver and platinum encrusted with lapis-lazuli, onyx, coral, and other colourful stones; Other bracelets were intended for the upper arms, and several bracelets were often worn at the same time. The short haircuts of women in the twenties called for elaborate deco earring designs. As women began to smoke in public, designers created very ornate cigarette cases and ivory cigarette holders. The invention of the wristwatch before World War I inspired jewelers to create extraordinary, decorated watches, encrusted with diamonds and plated with enamel, gold and silver. Pendant watches, hanging from a ribbon, also became fashionable.

The established jewellery houses of Paris in the period, Cartier, Chaumet, Georges Fouquet, Mauboussin, and Van Cleef & Arpels all created jewellery and objects in the new fashion. The firm of Chaumet made highly geometric cigarette boxes, cigarette lighters, pillboxes and notebooks, made of hard stones decorated with jade, lapis lazuli, diamonds and sapphires. They were joined by many young new designers, each with his own idea of deco. Raymond Templier designed pieces with highly intricate geometric patterns, including silver earrings that looked like skyscrapers. Gerard Sandoz was only 18 when he started to design jewelry in 1921; he designed many celebrated pieces based on the smooth and polished look of modern machinery. The glass designer René Lalique also entered the field, creating pendants of fruit, flowers, frogs, fairies or mermaids made of sculpted glass in bright colors, hanging on cords of silk with tassels. The jeweller Paul Brandt contrasted rectangular and triangular patterns, and embedded pearls in lines on onyx plaques. Jean Despres made necklaces of contrasting colours by bringing together silver and black lacquer, or gold with lapis lazuli. Many of his designs looked like highly polished pieces of machines. Jean Dunand was also inspired by modern machinery, combined with bright reds and blacks contrasting with polished metal. Other notable names in the Art Deco movement include Boucheron, Lacloche, and Danish silversmith Georg Jensen, known for his work with silver and less expensive gemstones. American jewelry houses such as Tiffany & Co., Black, Starr & Frost, and Marcus & Co. also made significant contributions, producing pieces that included clocks and objets d'art, as well as jewelry.

== Glass art ==
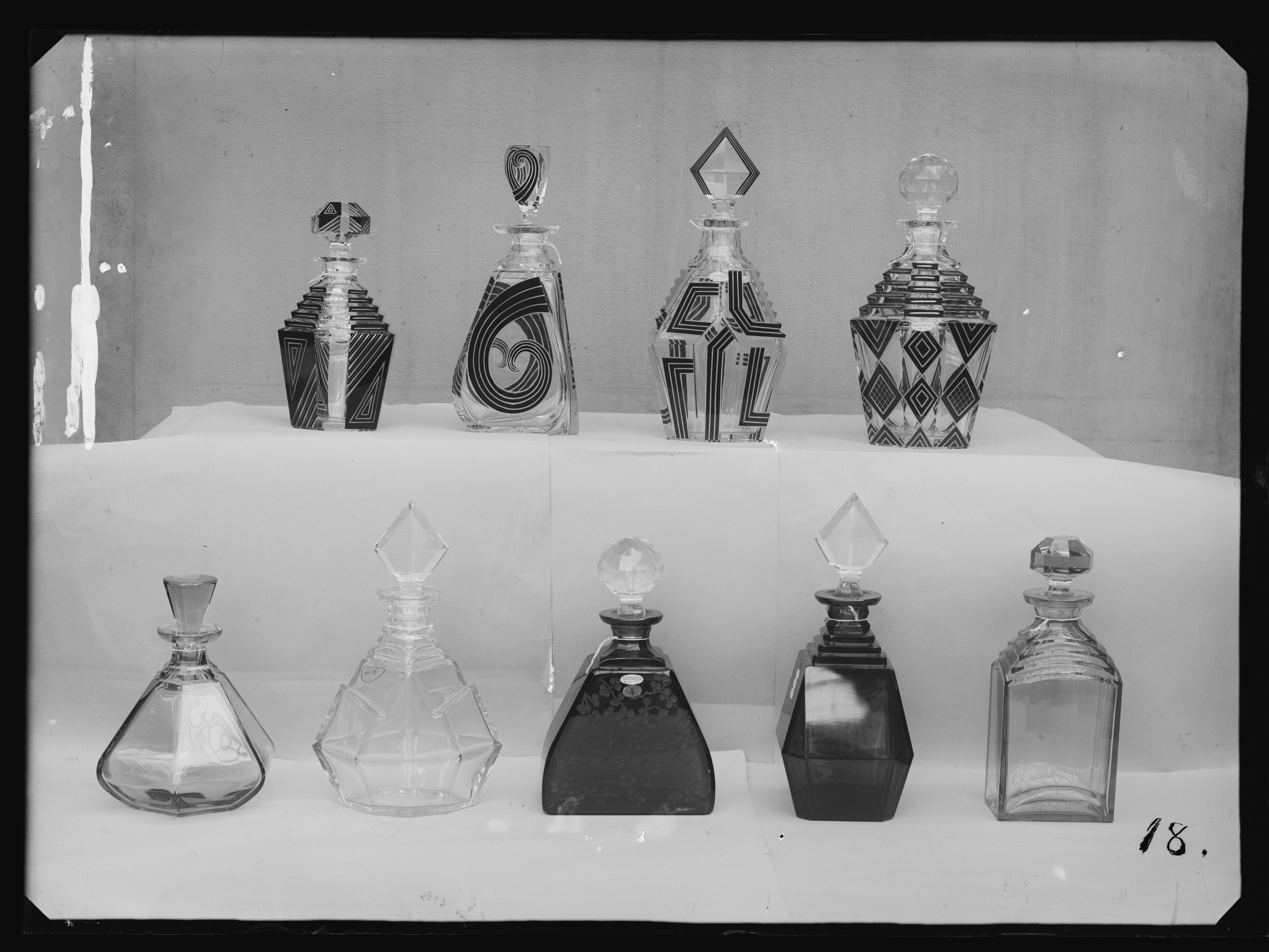
Bottles, unknown designer or producer (1920s)

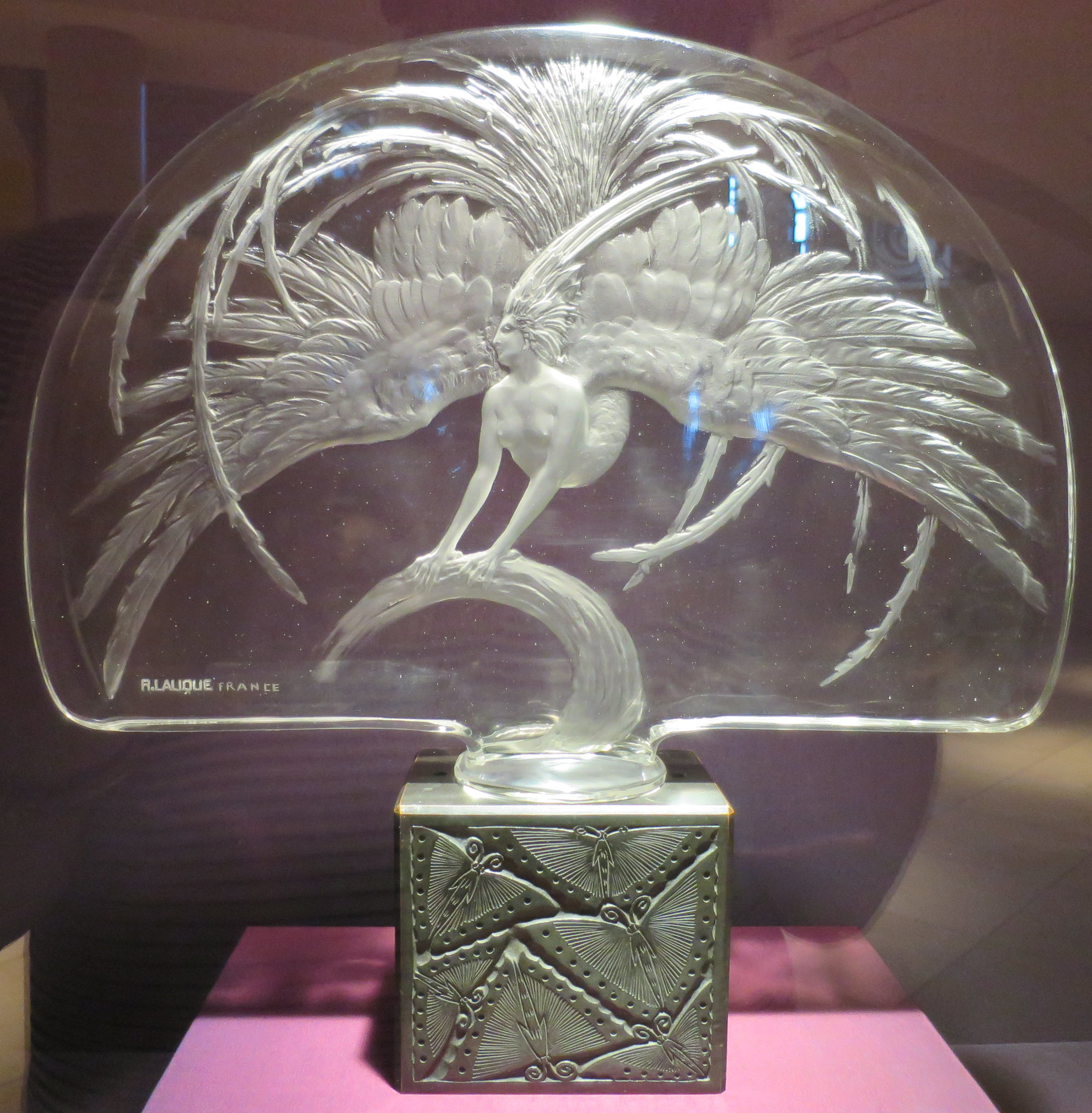
The Firebird by René Lalique (1922), Dayton Art Institute, US

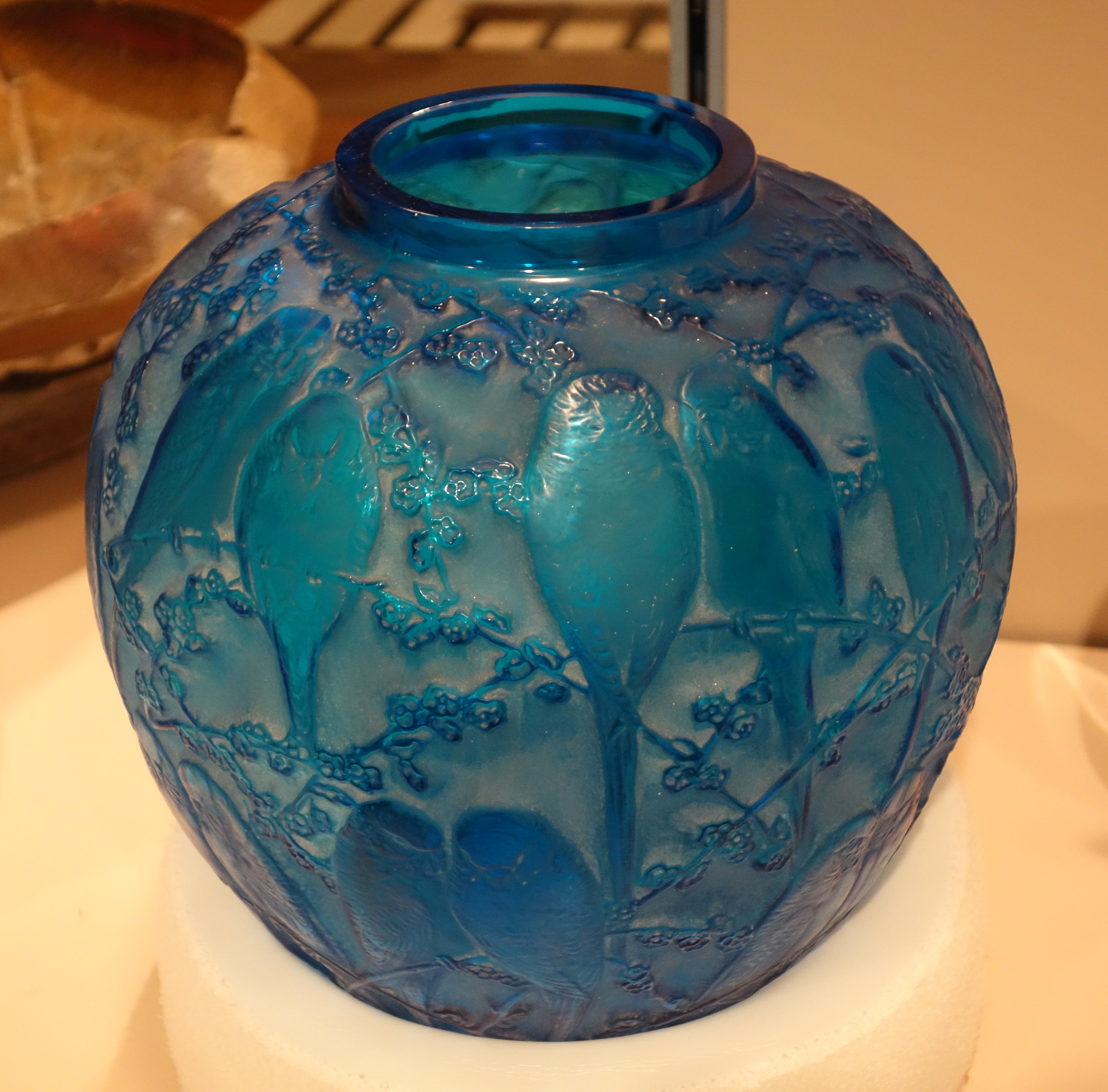
Parrot vase by Lalique (1922), Cincinnati Art Museum, US

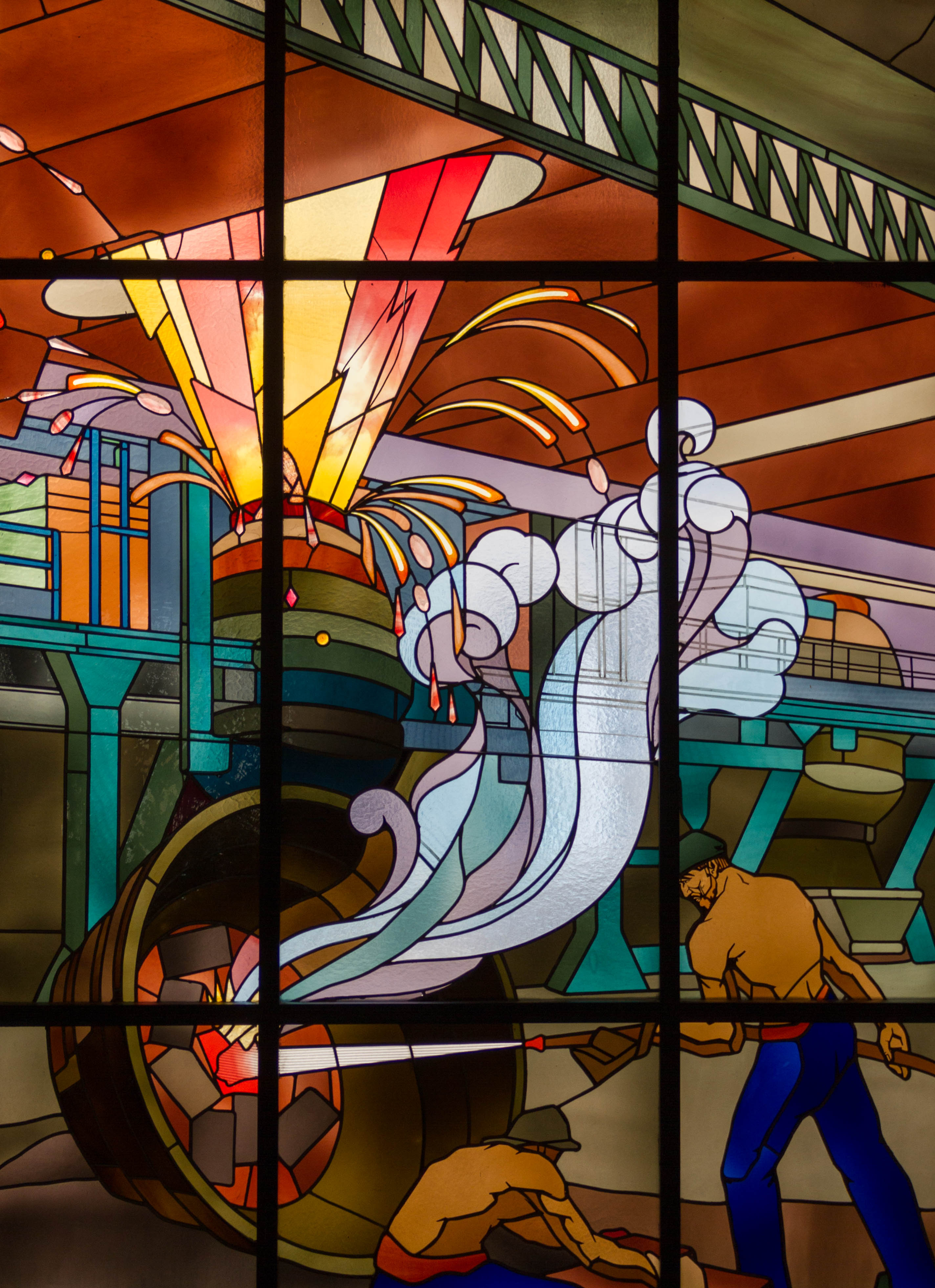
Window for a steel mill office by Louis Majorelle (1928), Grands bureaux des Aciéries de Longwy, Longlaville, France

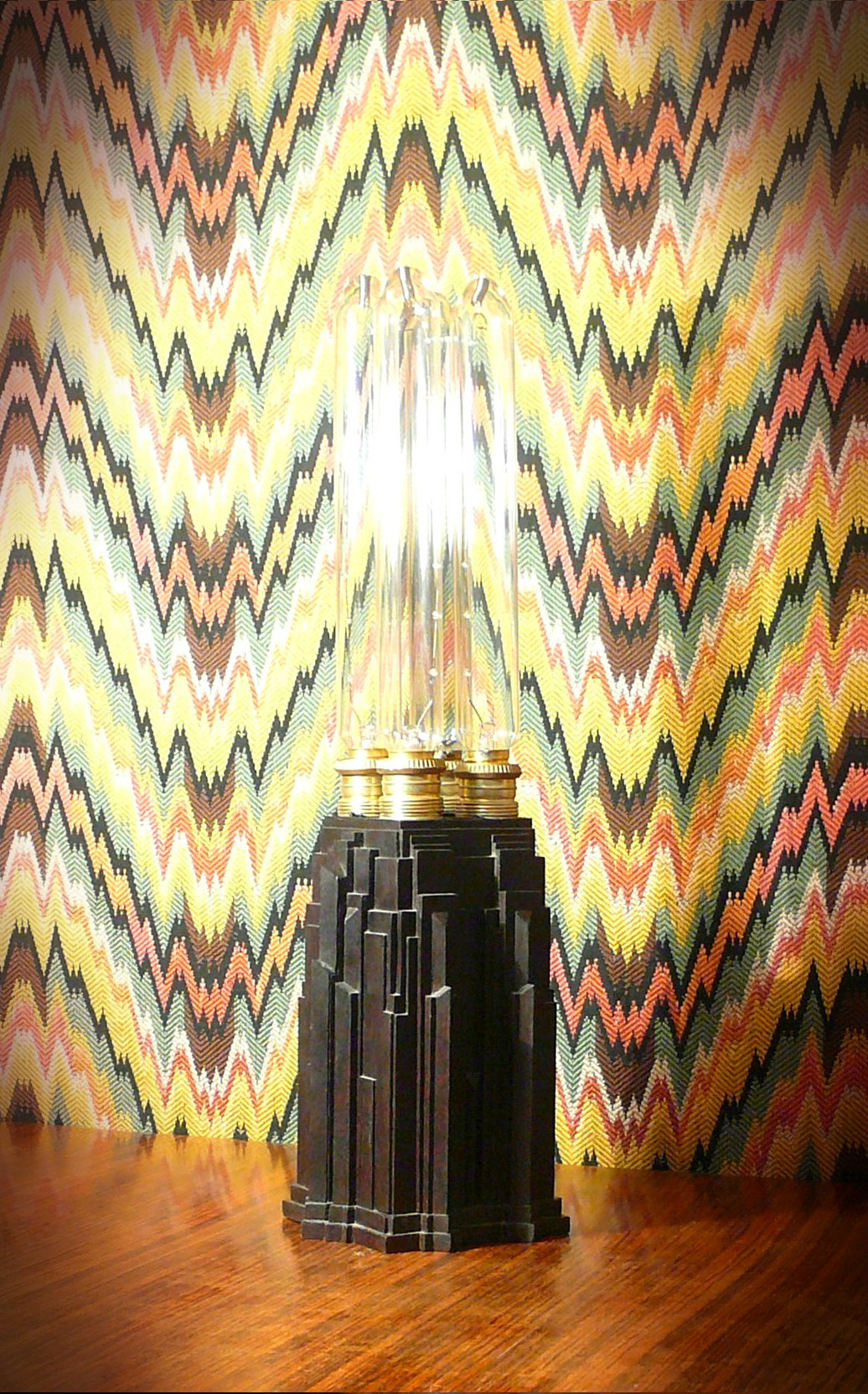
Skyscraper Lamp, designed by Arnaldo dell'Ira (1929), Arnaldo dell'Ira Collection

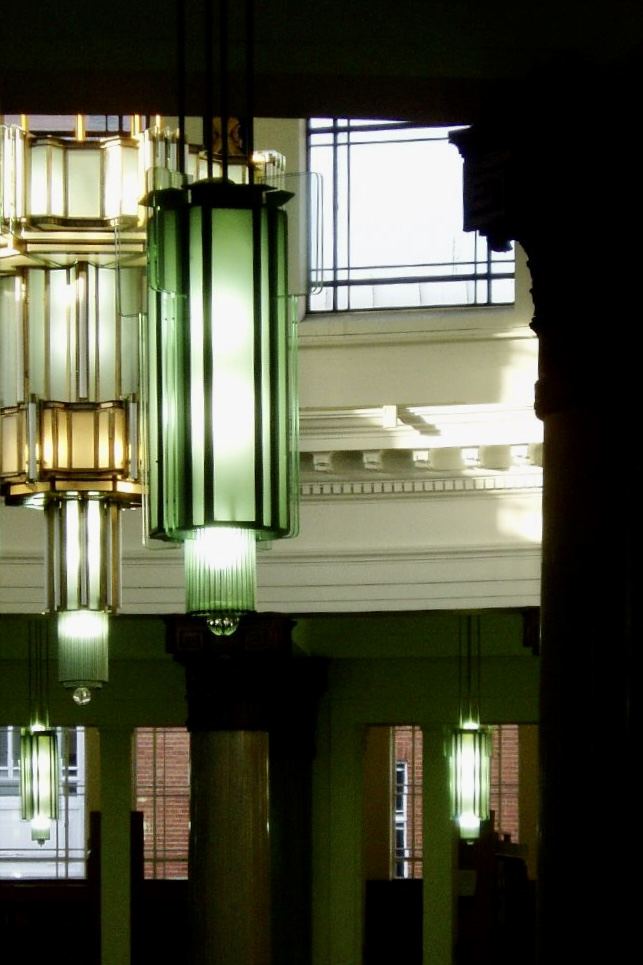
Angular chandeliers by Lanchester & Lodge (c. 1929–1936), Brotherton Library, University of Leeds, West Yorkshire, UK

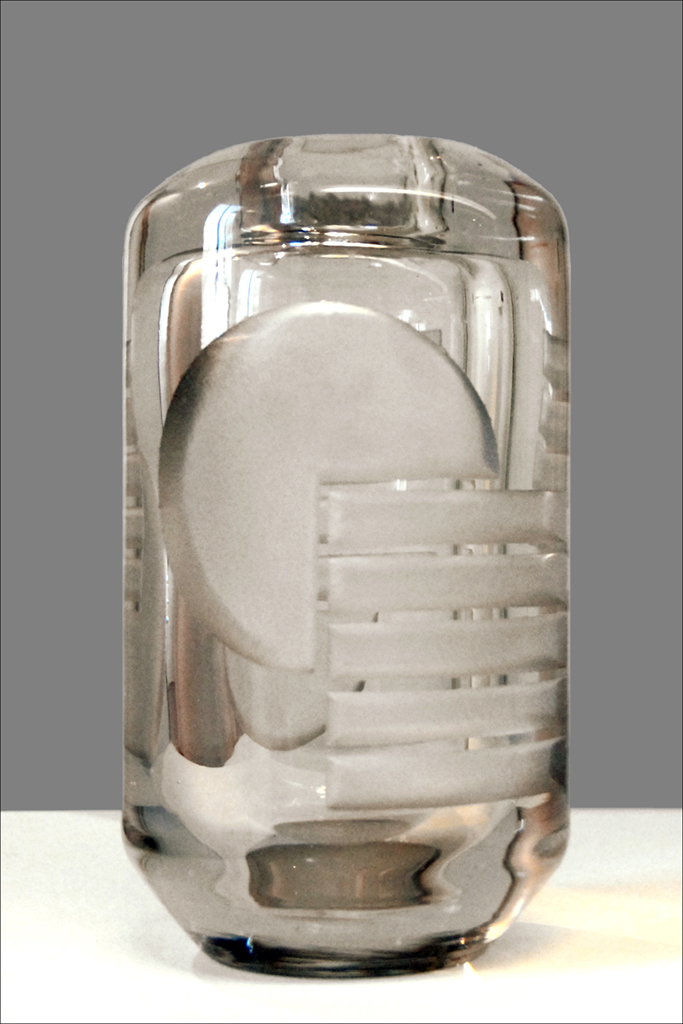
Vase by Daum (c. 1930–1935), Museum of Decorative Arts, Paris

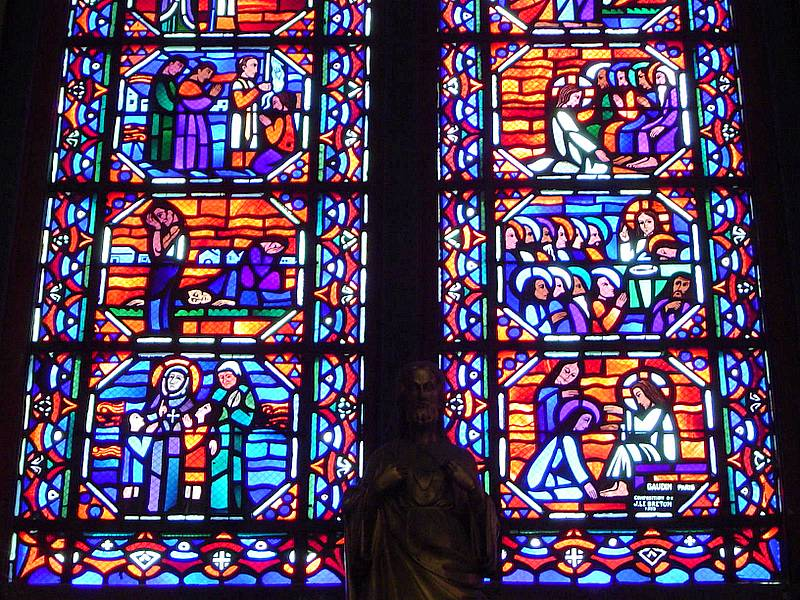
Stained glass windows by Jean Gaudin (1932–1934), Amiens Cathedral, Amiens, France

Like the Art Nouveau period before it, Art Deco was an exceptional period for fine glass and other decorative objects designed to fit their architectural surroundings. The most famous producer of glass objects was René Lalique, whose works, from vases to hood ornaments for automobiles, became symbols of the period. He had experimented with glass before World War I, designing bottles for the perfumes of François Coty, but he did not begin serious production of art glass until after World War I. In 1918, at the age of 58, he bought a large glass works in Combs-la-Ville and began to manufacture both artistic and practical glass objects. He treated glass as a form of sculpture, creating statuettes, vases, bowls, lamps and ornaments. He used demi-crystal rather than lead crystal, which was softer and easier to form, though not as lustrous. He sometimes used coloured glass, but more often used opalescent glass, where part or the whole of the outer surface was stained with a wash. Lalique provided the decorative glass panels, lights and illuminated glass ceilings for the ocean liners SS Île de France in 1927 and the SS Normandie in 1935, and for some of the first-class sleeping cars of the French railroads. At the 1925 Exposition of Decorative Arts, he had his own pavilion, designed a dining room with a table setting and matching glass ceiling for the Sèvres Pavilion, and designed a glass fountain for the courtyard of the Cours des Métiers, a slender glass column which spouted water from the sides and was illuminated at night.

Other notable Art Deco glass manufacturers included Marius-Ernest Sabino, who specialized in figurines, vases, bowls, and glass sculptures of fish, nudes, and animals. For these he often used an opalescent glass which could change from white to blue to amber, depending upon the light. His vases and bowls featured molded friezes of animals, nudes or busts of women with fruit or flowers. His work was less subtle but more colourful than that of Lalique.

Other notable Deco glass designers included Edmond Etling, who also used bright opalescent colours, often with geometric patterns and sculpted nudes; Albert Simonet, and Aristide Colotte and Maurice Marinot, who was known for his deeply etched sculptural bottles and vases. The firm of Daum from the city of Nancy, which had been famous for its Art Nouveau glass, produced a line of Deco vases and glass sculpture, solid, geometric and chunky in form. More delicate multi-coloured works were made by Gabriel Argy-Rousseau, who produced delicately shaded vases with sculpted butterflies and nymphs, and Francois Decorchemont, whose vases were streaked and marbled.

The Great Depression impacted on the decorative glass industry, which depended upon wealthy clients. Some artists turned to designing stained glass windows for churches. In 1937, the Steuben glass company began the practice of commissioning famous artists to produce glassware. Louis Majorelle, famous for his Art Nouveau furniture, designed a remarkable Art Deco stained glass window portraying steel workers for the offices of the Aciéries de Longwy, a steel mill in Longwy, France.

Amiens Cathedral has a rare example of Art Deco stained glass windows in the Chapel of the Sacred Heart, made in 1932–34 by the Paris glass artist Jean Gaudin based on drawings by Jacques Le Breton.

== Metal art ==
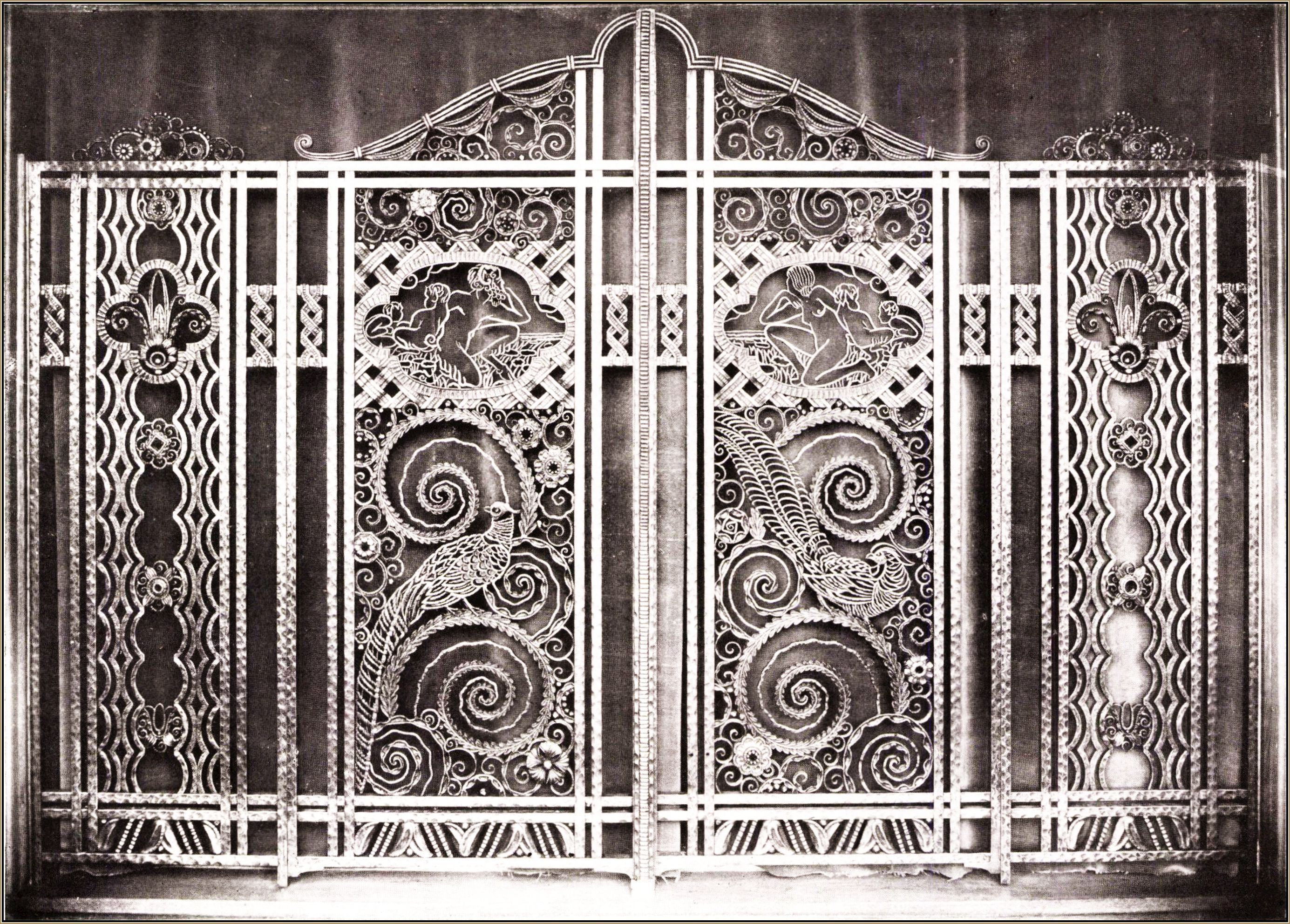
A grill with two wings called The Pheasants, made by Paul Kiss and displayed at the 1925 Exposition of Decorative and Industrial Arts

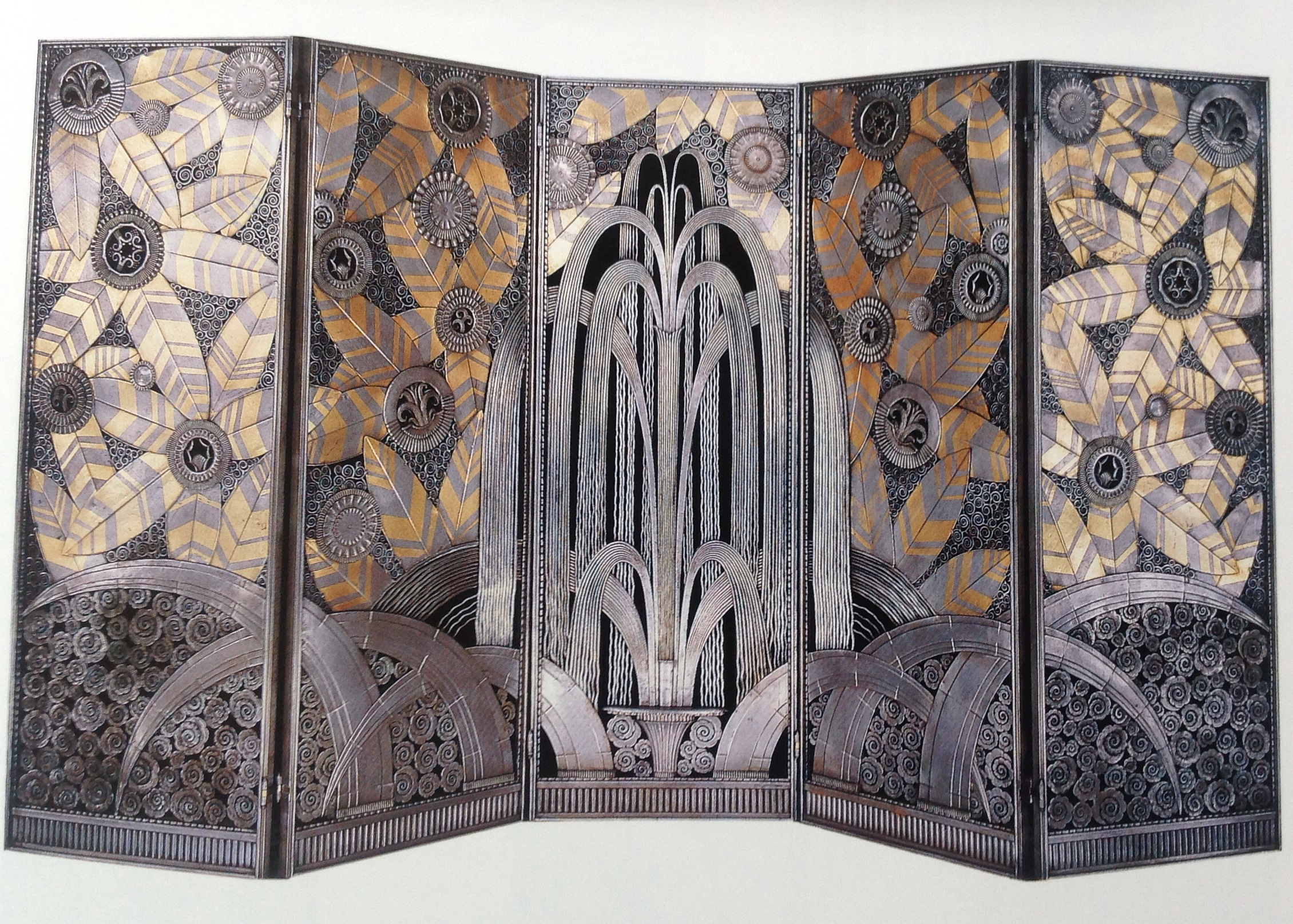
Iron and copper grill called Oasis by Edgar Brandt, displayed at the 1925 Paris Exposition

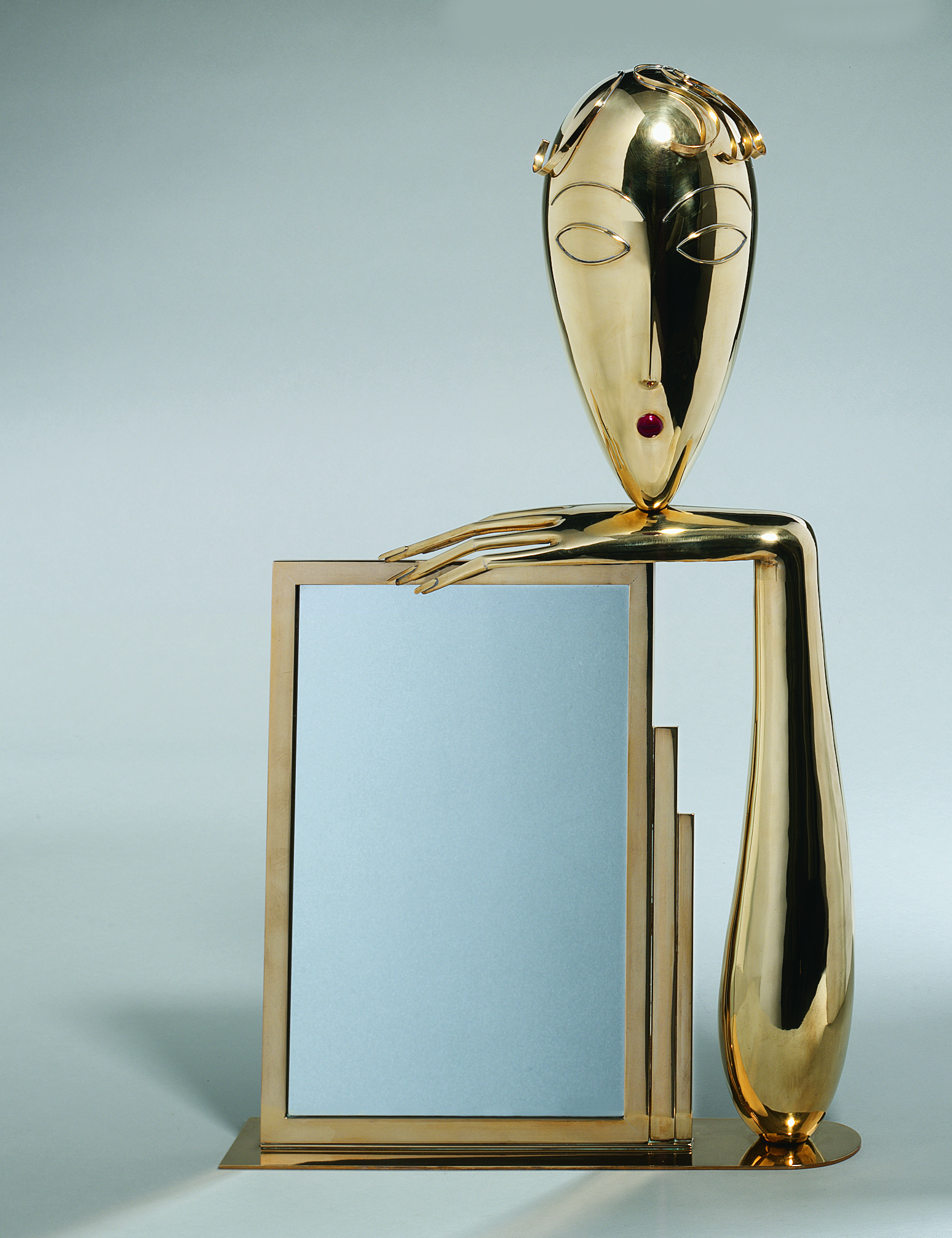
Table mirror by Franz Hagenauer of Werkstätte Hagenauer Wien (c. 1930)

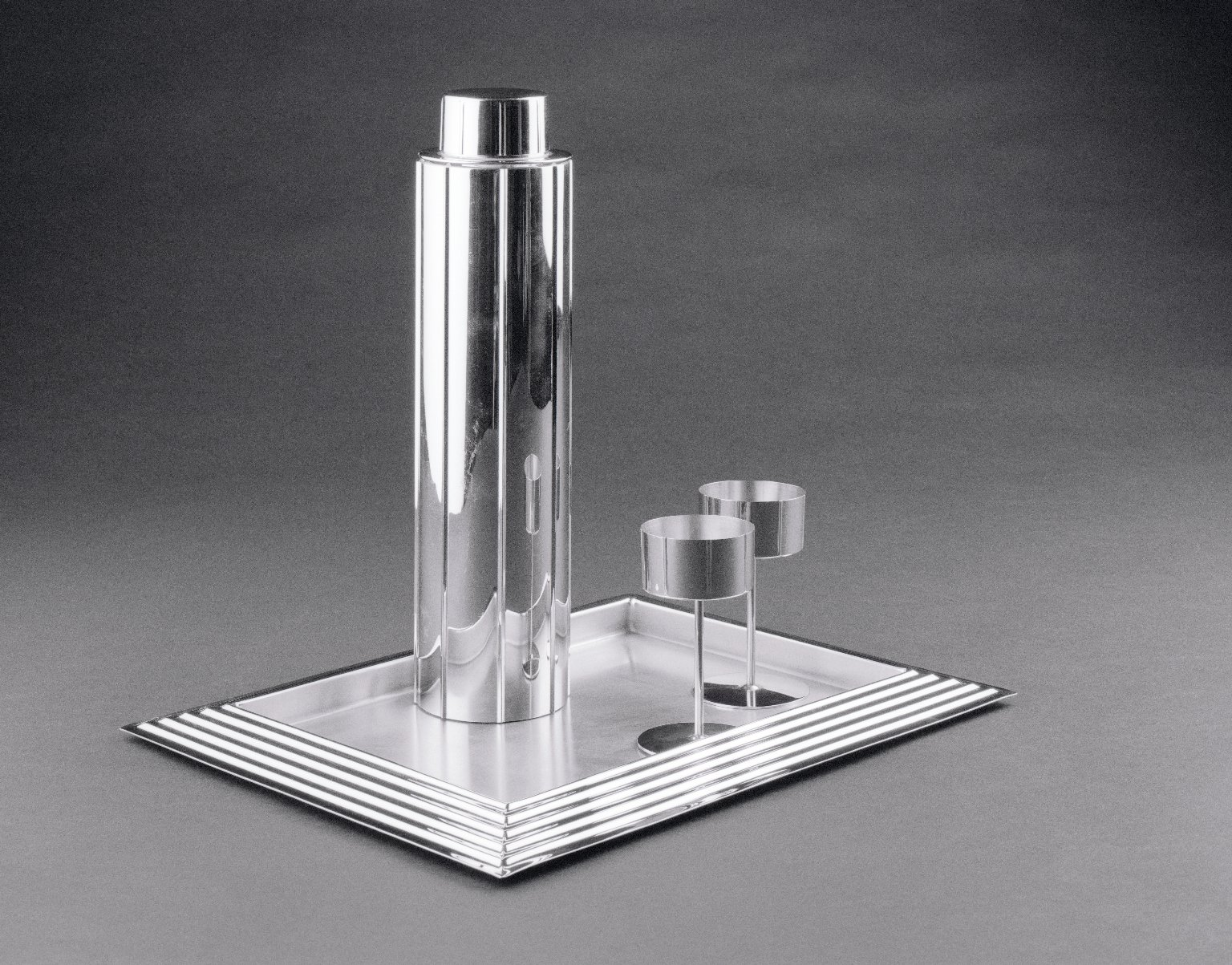
Cocktail set of chrome-plated steel by Norman Bel Geddes (1937)

Art Deco artists produced a wide variety of practical objects in the Art Deco style, made of industrial materials from traditional wrought iron to chrome-plated steel. The American artist Norman Bel Geddes designed a cocktail set resembling a skyscraper made of chrome-plated steel. Raymond Subes designed an elegant metal grille for the entrance of the Palais de la Porte Dorée, the centre-piece of the 1931 Paris Colonial Exposition. The French sculptor Jean Dunand produced magnificent doors on the theme "The Hunt", covered with gold leaf and paint on plaster (1935).

== In fiction ==
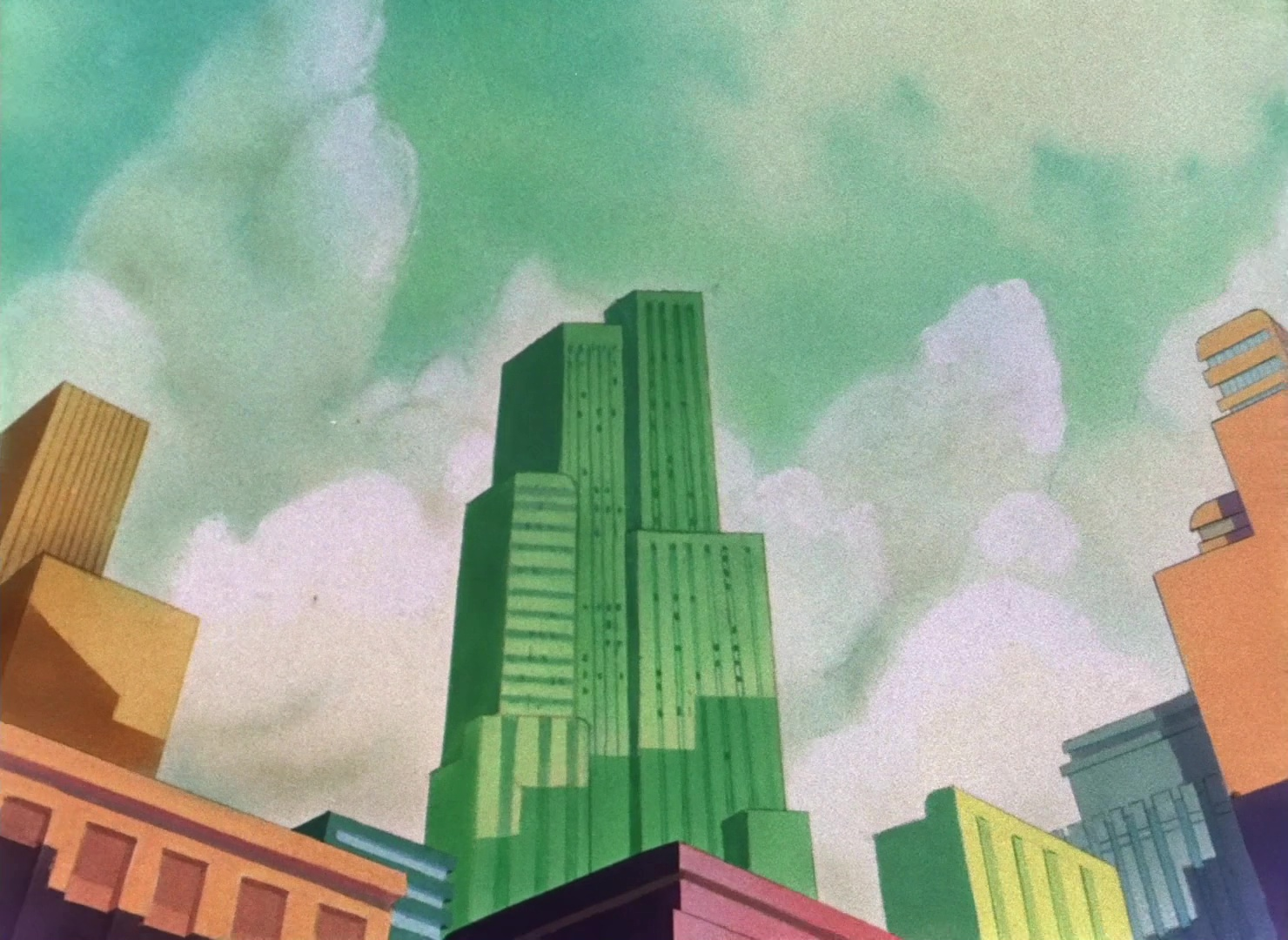
Art Deco skyscrapers in Falling Hare (1943).

Art Deco visuals and imagery was used in multiple animated films including Batman, Night Hood, All's Fair at the Fair, Merry Mannequins, Miss Glory, Fantasia and Sleeping Beauty. The architecture is featured in the fictitious underwater city of Rapture in the BioShock video game series.

Art Deco visuals were an inspiration for the architecture of Iacon City in the animated science fiction film Transformers One.

== Preservation and neo-Art Deco ==
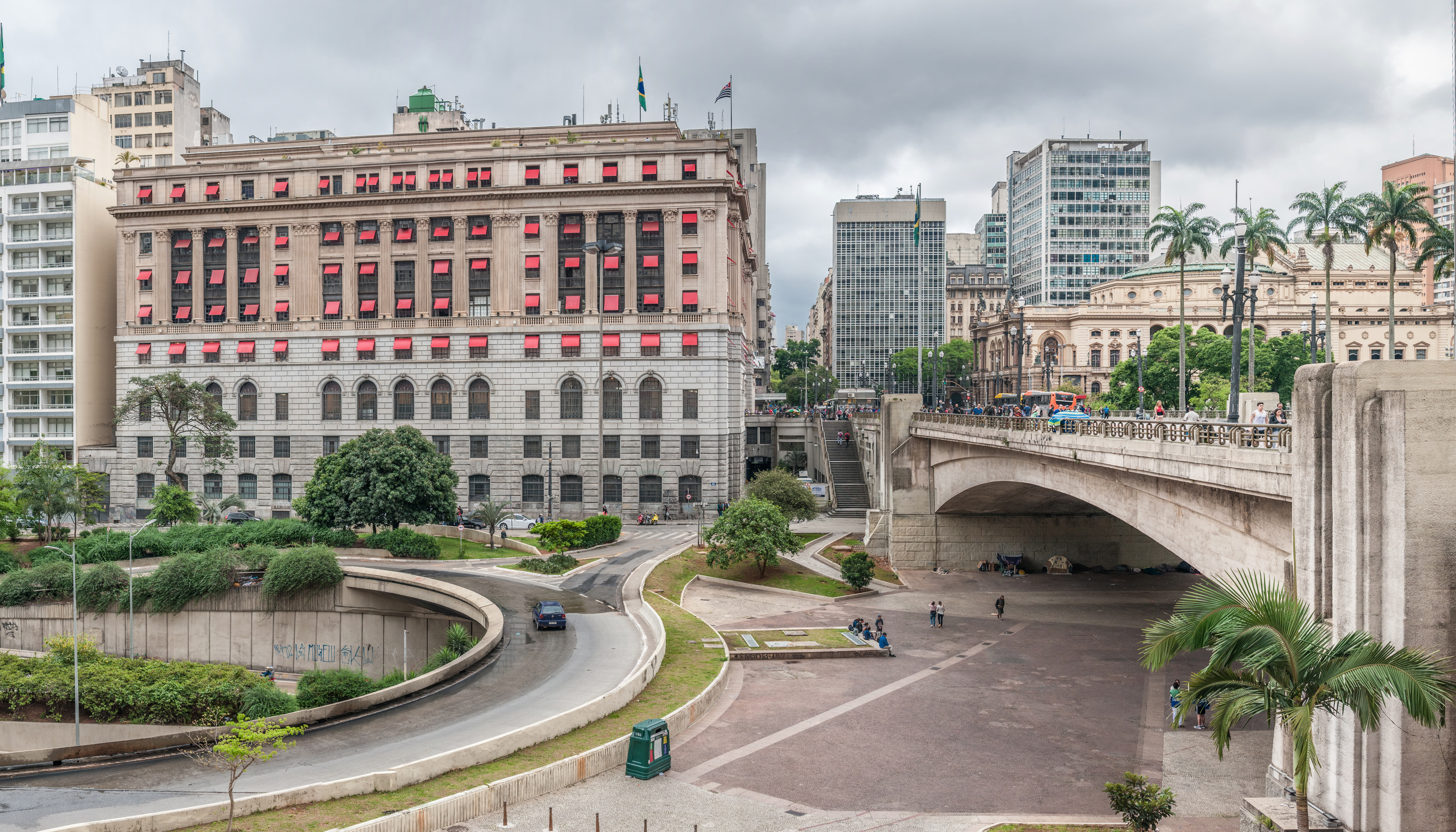
Viaduto do Chá in São Paulo, built in 1892, is a historical heritage of the city

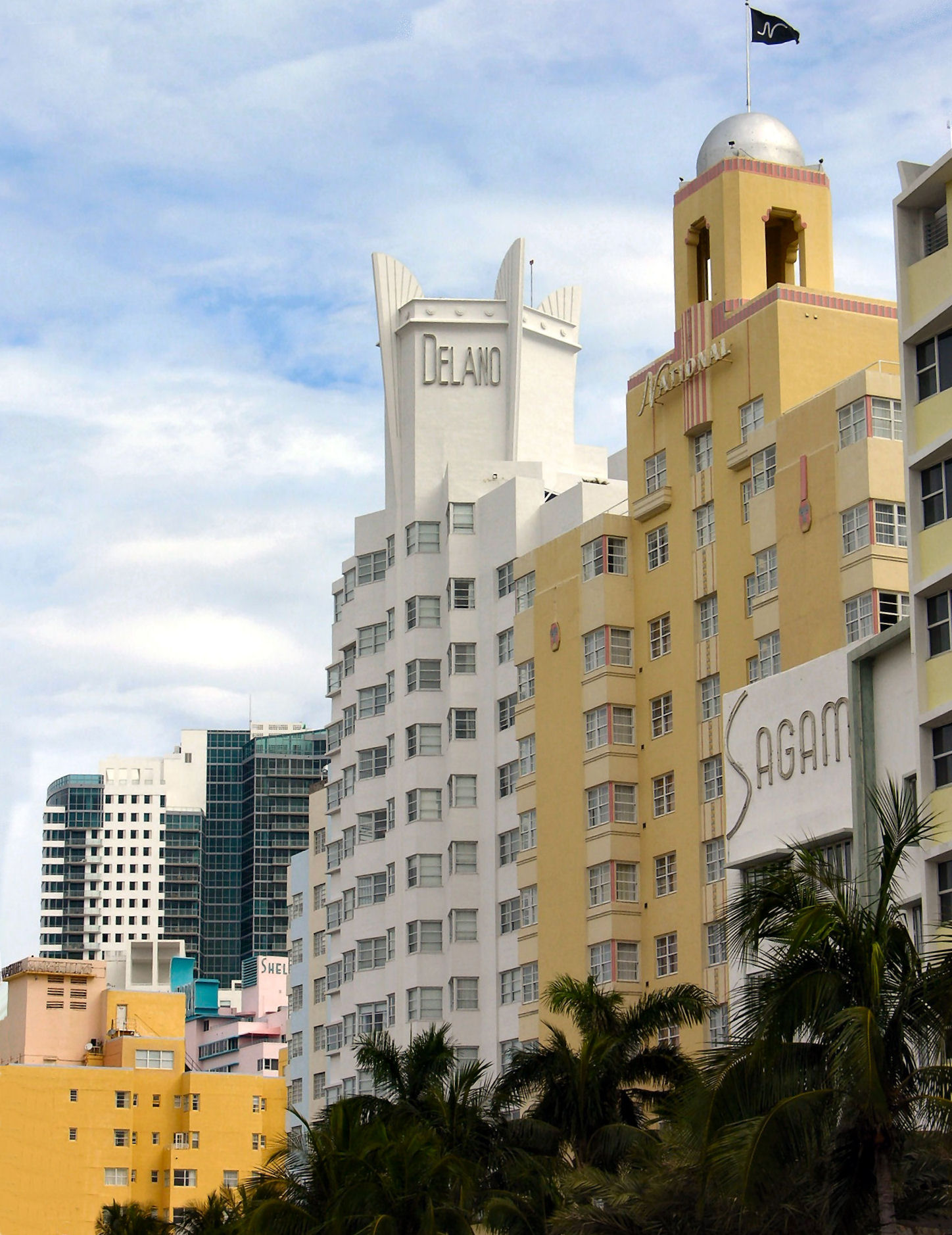
The Miami Beach Architectural District in Miami, Florida, protects historical Art Deco buildings.

Telephone Company Building on Calea Victoriei in Bucharest (1929–1934) by Walter Froy, Louis S. Weeks and Edmond van Saanen Algi, qualified as a monument istoric (Romanian for historic monument)

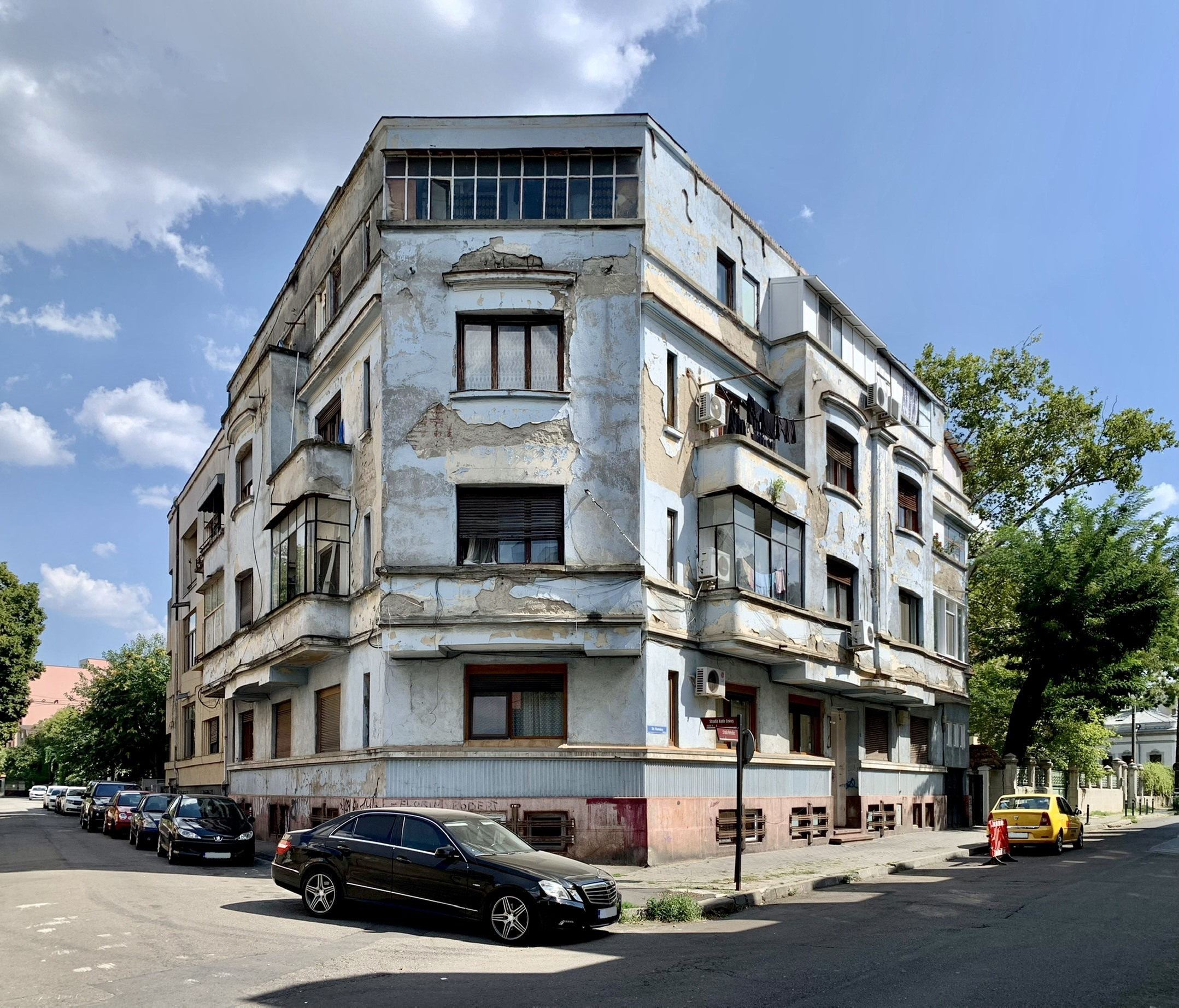
Strada Romulus no. 75 in Bucharest (1930s) by unknown architect, in a state of decay

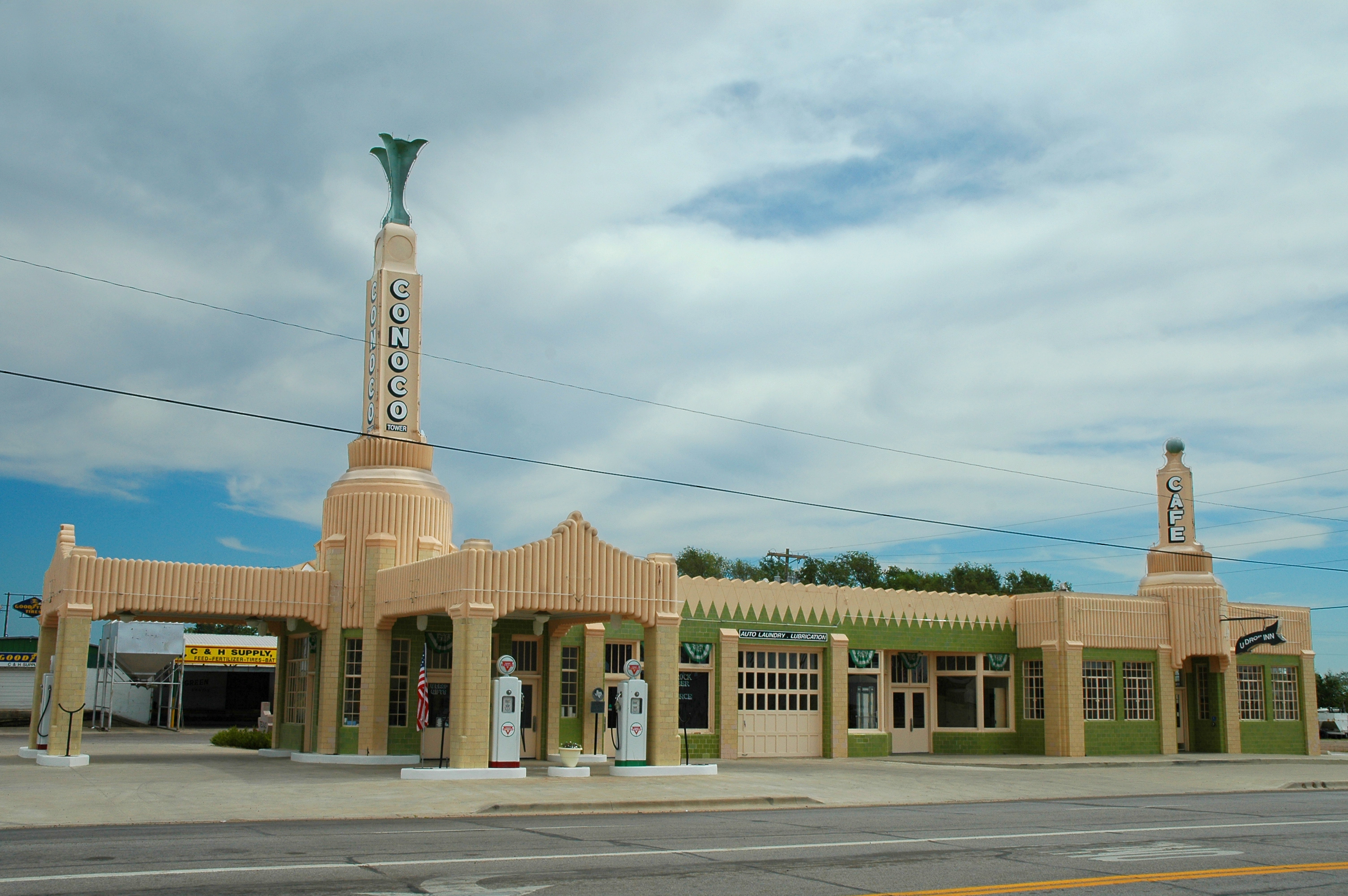
U-Drop Inn, a roadside gas station and diner on U.S. Highway 66 in Shamrock, Texas (1936), now a historical monument

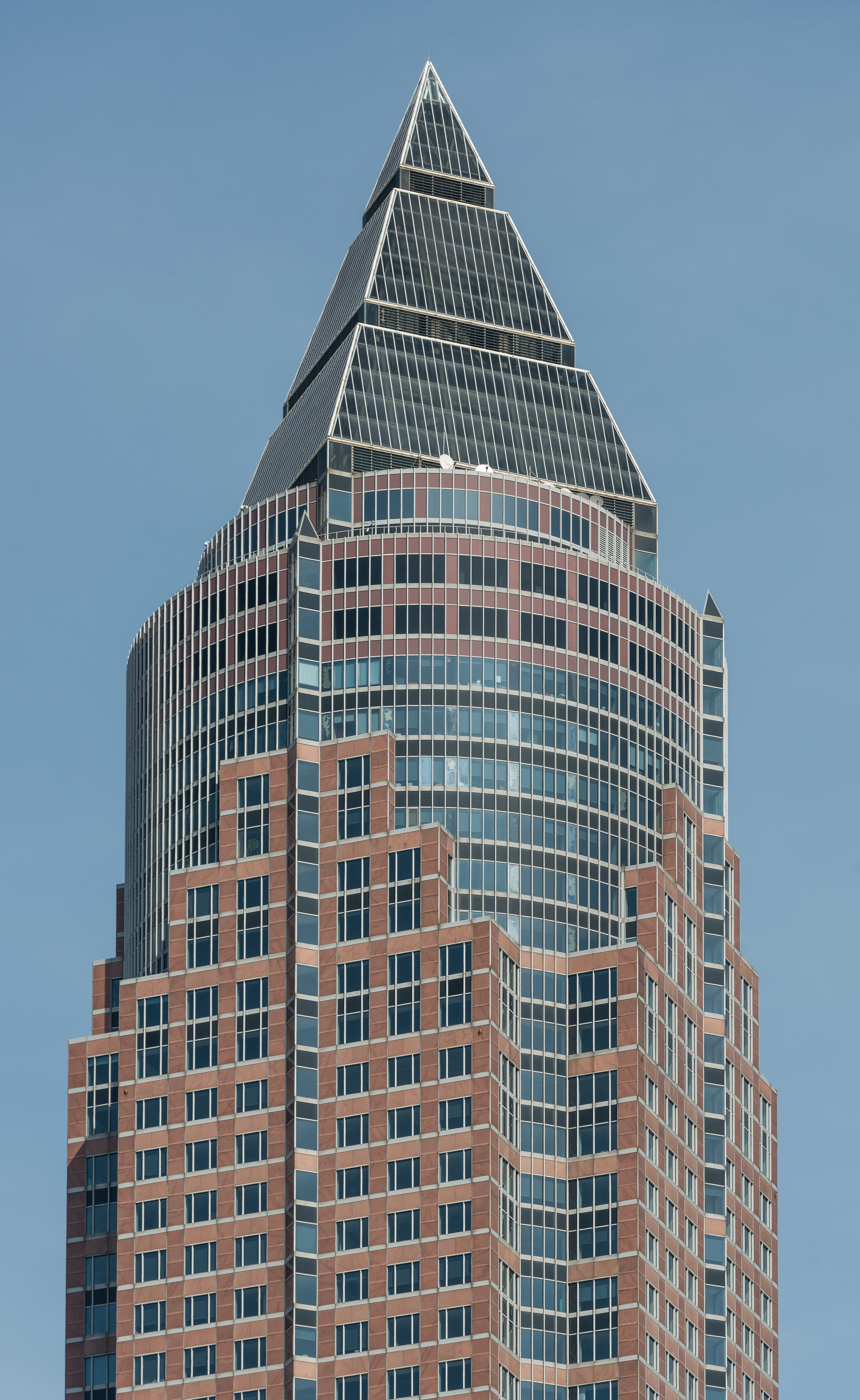
Messeturm in Frankfurt, Germany, by Helmut Jahn (1990), a Postmodern building that is reminiscent of Art Deco architecture

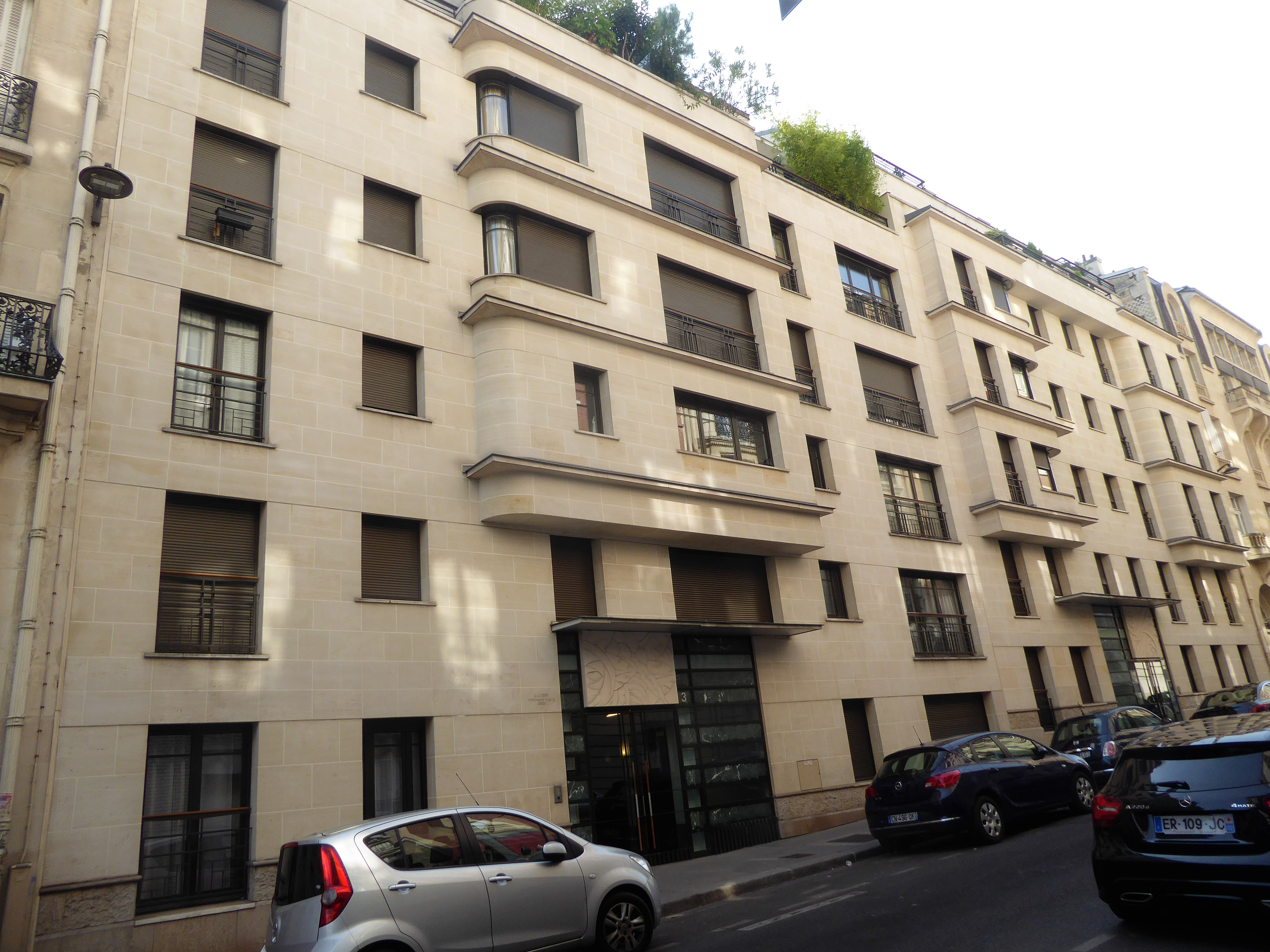
Rue Henri Heine no. 3–5 in Paris by J.J. Ory (2001), a neo-Art Deco building

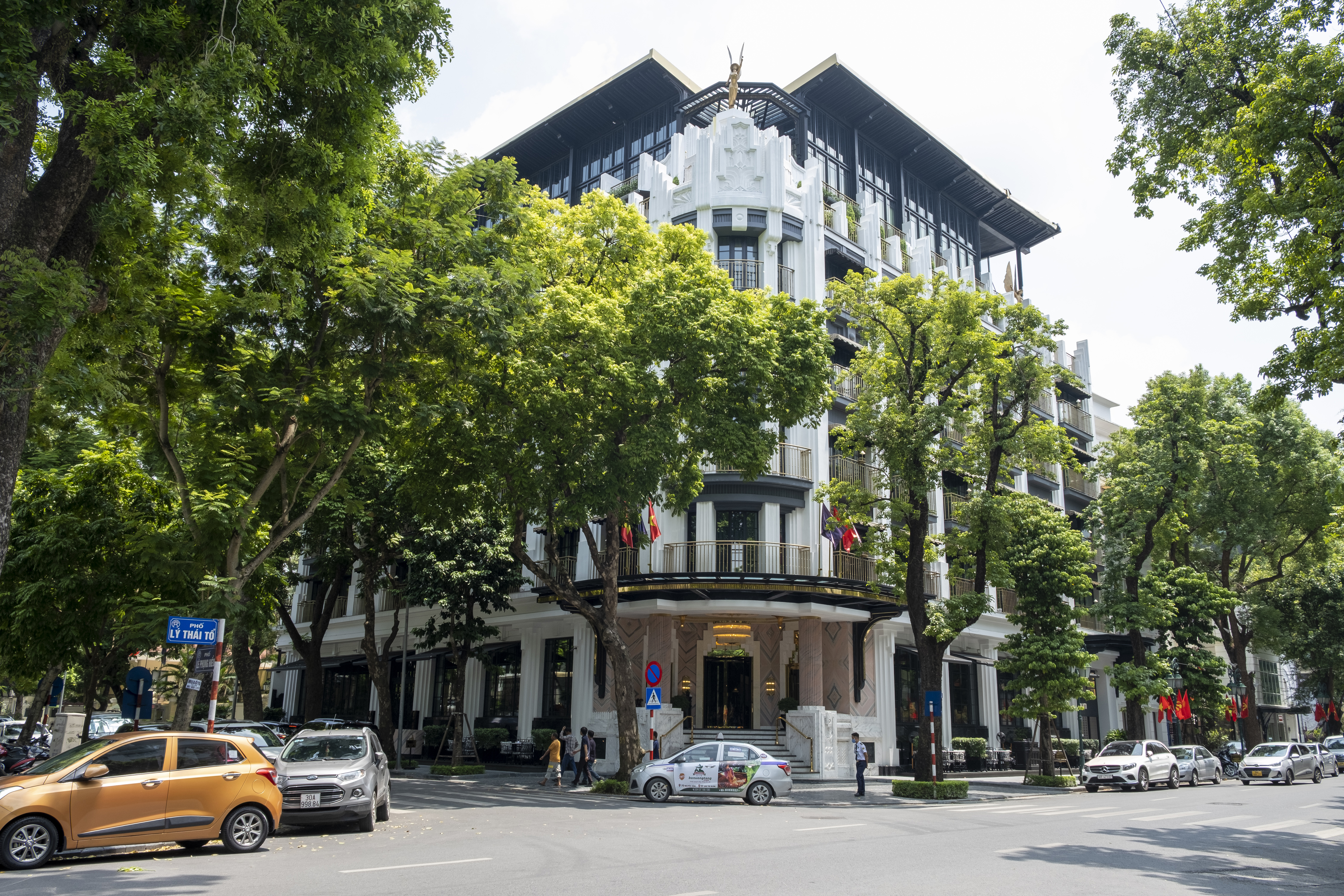
Capella Hanoi in Vietnam (2021), a neo-Art Deco building

In many cities, efforts have been made to protect the remaining Art Deco buildings. In many U.S. cities, historic Art Deco cinemas have been preserved and turned into cultural centres. Even more modest Art Deco buildings have been preserved as part of America's architectural heritage; an Art Deco café and gas station along Route 66 in Shamrock, Texas is an historic monument. The Miami Beach Architectural District protects several hundred old buildings, and requires that new buildings comply with the style. In Havana, Cuba, many Art Deco buildings have badly deteriorated. Efforts are underway to bring the buildings back to their original appearance.

In the 21st century, modern variants of Art Deco, called Neo Art Deco (or neo-Art Deco), have appeared in some American cities, inspired by the classic Art Deco buildings of the 1920s and 1930s. Examples include the NBC Tower in Chicago, inspired by 30 Rockefeller Plaza in New York City; the Smith Center for the Performing Arts in Las Vegas, Nevada, which includes Art Deco call backs to the Hoover Dam; 99 Hudson in Jersey City, New Jersey, the state's tallest building and the 46th tallest in the United States, which features Art Deco-inspired limestone and glass lineation; and the Brooklyn Tower in Brooklyn, New York, the borough's tallest building and the 19th tallest in the country, with its black glass and bronze piping.

== See also ==
- Roaring Twenties
- 1920s in Western fashion
- Années folles
- 1933 Chicago World's Fair Century of Progress
- 1936 Fair Park built for Texas Centennial Exposition
- Art Deco stamps

== Bibliography ==
- Ardman, Harvey (1985). Normandie, Her Life and Times. New York: Franklin Watts. ISBN 0531097846.
- Arwas, Victor (1992). Art Deco. Harry N. Abrams Inc. ISBN 0-8109-1926-5.
- Bayer, Patricia (1999). Art Deco Architecture: Design, Decoration and Detail from the Twenties and Thirties. Thames & Hudson. ISBN 978-0-500-28149-9.
- Benton, Charlotte; Benton, Tim; Wood, Ghislaine (2003). Art Deco: 1910–1939. Bulfinch. ISBN 978-0-8212-2834-0.
- Blondel, Alain; Lempicka, Tamara de (1999). Tamara de Lempicka: a Catalogue Raisonné 1921–1980. Lausanne: Editions Acatos. ISBN 978-2-940033-28-7. OCLC 41928887.
- Breeze, Carla (2003). American Art Deco: Modernistic Architecture and Regionalism. W. W. Norton. ISBN 978-0-393-01970-4.
- Cabanne, Pierre (1986). Encyclopédie Art Deco (in French). Somogy. ISBN 2-85056-178-9.
- Charles, Victoria (2013). Art Déco. Parkstone International. ISBN 978-1-84484-864-5.
- De Morant, Henry (1970). Histoire des arts décoratifs (in French). Hachette.
- Ducher, Rpbert (2014). La charactéristique des styles (in French). Flammarion. ISBN 978-2-0813-4383-2.
- Duncan, Alastair (1988). Art déco. Thames & Hudson. ISBN 2-87811-003-X.
- Duncan, Alastair (2009). Art Deco Complete: The Definitive Guide to the Decorative Arts of the 1920s and 1930s. Abrams. ISBN 978-0-8109-8046-4.
- Gallagher, Fiona (2002). Christie's Art Deco. Pavilion Books. ISBN 978-1-86205-509-4.
- Hillier, Bevis (1968). Art Deco of the 20s and 30s. Studio Vista. ISBN 978-0-289-27788-1.
- Hope, Mike (22 July 2019). Art Deco Architecture: The Interwar Period. The Crowood Press. ISBN 978-1-78500-600-5.
- Le Corbusier (1996). L'Art Decoratif Aujourd'hui (in French). Flammarion. ISBN 978-2-0812-2062-1.
- Long, Christopher (2007). Paul T. Frankl and Modern American Design. Yale University Press. ISBN 978-0-300-12102-5.
- Lucie-Smith, Edward (1996). Art Deco Painting. Phaidon Press. ISBN 978-0-7148-3576-1.
- Ray, Gordon N. (2005). Tansell, G. Thomas (ed.). The Art Deco Book in France. Bibliographical Society of The University of Virginia. ISBN 978-1-883631-12-3.
- Lehmann, Niels (2012). Rauhut, Christoph (ed.). Modernism London Style. Hirmer. ISBN 978-3-7774-8031-2.
- Morel, Guillaume (2012). Art Déco (in French). Éditions Place des Victoires. ISBN 978-2-8099-0701-8.
- Okroyan, Mkrtich (2008–2011). Art Deco Sculpture: From Root to Flourishing (vol.1,2) (in Russian). Russian Art Institute. ISBN 978-5-905495-02-1.
- Plagnieux, Philippe (2003). Cathérale Notre Dame d'Amiens (in French). Éditions du Patrimoine, Centre des Monuments Nationaux. ISBN 978-27577-0404-2.
- Plum, Giles (2014). Paris architectures de la Belle Epoque (in French). Parigramme. ISBN 978-2-84096-800-9.
- Poisson, Michel (2009). 1000 Immeubles et monuments de Paris (in French). Parigramme. ISBN 978-2-84096-539-8.
- Savage, Rebecca Binno; Kowalski, Greg (2004). Art Deco in Detroit (Images of America). Arcadia. ISBN 978-0-7385-3228-8.
- Texier, Simon (2012). Paris: Panorama de l'architecture (in French). Parigramme. ISBN 978-2-84096-667-8.
- Texier, Simon (2019). Art Déco. Editions Ouest-France. ISBN 978-27373-8172-0.
- Unes, Wolney (2003). Identidade Art Déco de Goiânia (in Portuguese). Ateliê. ISBN 85-7480-090-2.
- Vincent, G.K. (2008). A History of Du Cane Court: Land, Architecture, People and Politics. Woodbine Press. ISBN 978-0-9541675-1-6.
- Ward, Mary; Ward, Neville (1978). Home in the Twenties and Thirties. Ian Allan. ISBN 0-7110-0785-3.
