= Art Deco Museum =

Museum in Moscow, Russia

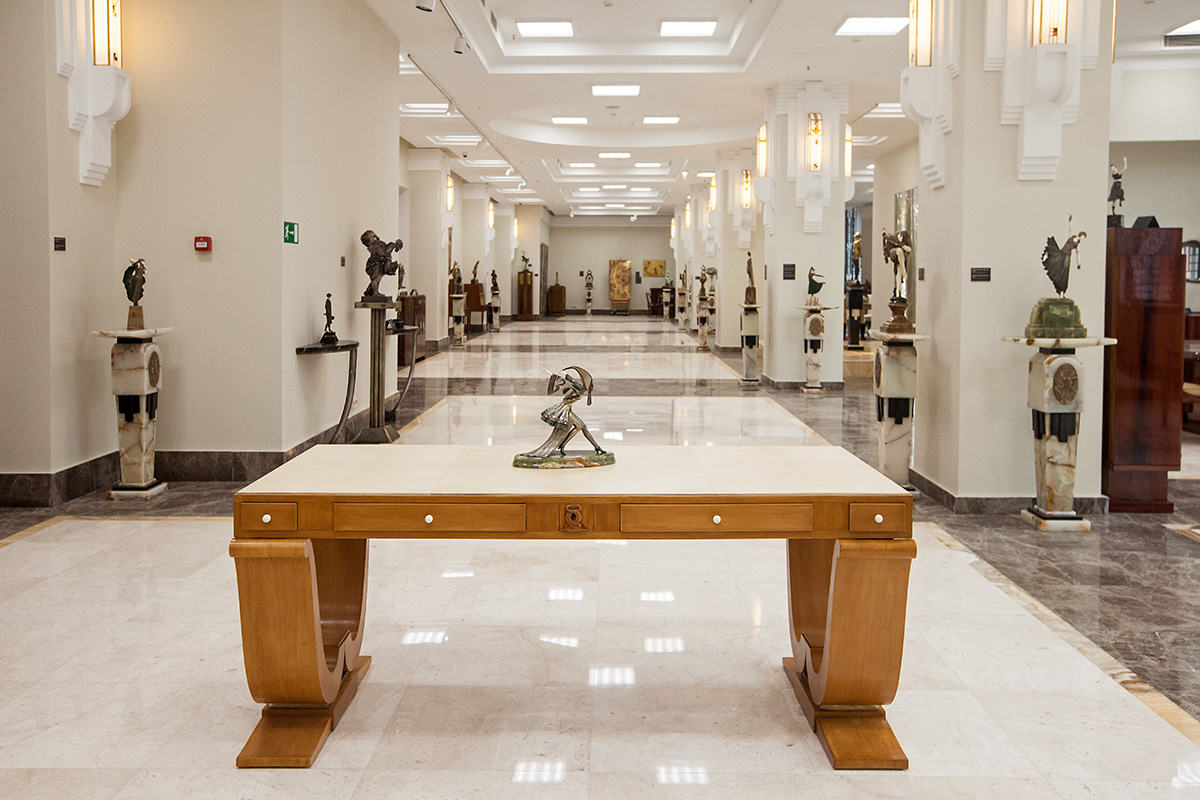

- Location within Moscow
- Established: 2014; 12 years ago
- Location: Luzhnetskaya emb. 2/4, build. 4 Moscow, Russia
- Coordinates: 55°42′56″N 37°34′26″E
- Curator: Mkrtich O. Okroyan
- Website: en.artdecomuseum.ru

The Art Deco Museum is a museum in Moscow, Russia which opened in 2014.

Some of the better known exhibits are 'Les Girls' by Demetre Chiparus, 'Set of Furniture for a Billiard Room' by Louis Majorelle, decorative panels by Pierre Bobot originated from Roseland Ballroom in New York, 'La Chasse' by Jean Dunand 'The Fire and the Flame' by Ferdinand Preiss as well as Edgar Brandt pieces.

== History ==
The museum was opened by Mkrtich Okroyan in 2014 after he became an enthusiast of art deco architecture, building up a collection of artefacts worth over $100 million. He founded the Art Deco Russian House at "The Four Seasons" complex in 2005. In 2010, he opened the Art Deco Gallery in Bayer & Co factory on the Luzhnetskaya Quay. The building was the former mansion of Imperial Mint on the Luzhnetskaya Embankment. The museum joined the International Council of Museums (ICOM) in 2015.

== Collections ==
The museum's objects were collected by Okroyan over 20 years and now represents one of the largest collections of art deco end art nouveau objects in Russia. The collection includes more than 900 sculpture works in bronze and ivory of the 1920s years, more than 300 items of furniture, and as a significant number of objects of decorative and applied arts and graphics. The value of the collection is over USD$100 million.

=== Sculpture ===
The core of the collection consists of sculptures of Demetre Chiparus, a representative of plastic architecture from the art deco period. A piece in the collection is his composition Les Girls, representing five dancers on the stage of the music hall. The collection includes a number of works by Bruno Zach, Gerda Iro, Ferdinand Preiss, Paul Philippe, Otto Poertzel, Pierre Le Faguays and Claire Colinet.

=== Home decor ===
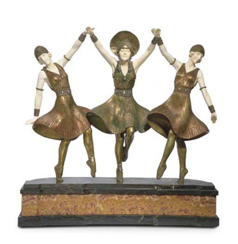
Demetre Chiparus (1886-1947). The Russian ballet. Bronze, gilding, patina, ivory, marble pedestal, onyx Height: 61 cm

At the beginning of the 2000s Mkrtich Okroyan collection was replenished with art deco home decor. The collection comprises works of designers of that time — Jacque-Emil Rulmana, Jules Lelio, Paul Follo, Lui Xiu and André Mar.

Decorative panels occupy one of the stages among the permanent exhibition of the museum. There is a panel by the Parisian decorator Pierre Bobo which was created for Roseland ballroom in New York. Also, the decorative works of the lacquer artist Jean Dunand who participated in decorating the interiors of the ocean liner Normandy are presented. The creative works of Edgar Brandt an ornamental blacksmith of Art Deco era is also presented in the collection of the museum.

=== Furniture art nouveau ===
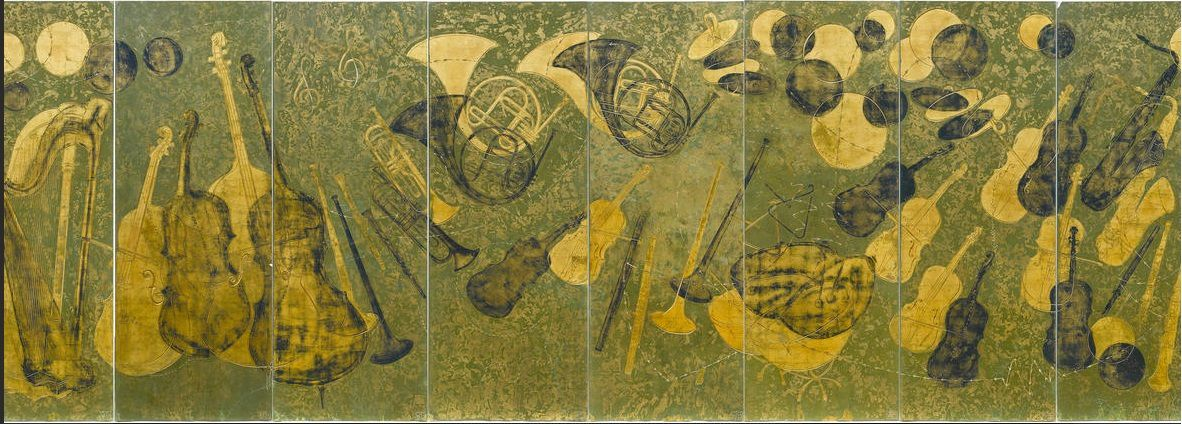
Bobo Pierre (1902-1974). Mural for dance hall Roseland in New York OK.1947 Plaster, mixed media

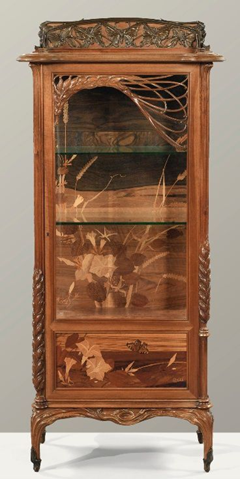
Émile Gallé (1846-1904) Showcase. About 1903 Veneer, bronze, inlay, glass

The works of French art nouveau masters: Émile Gallé and Louis Majorelle, sets of furniture for the living rooms of the Swiss sculptor Charles Albert Angst and House Dio are represented in one of the halls of the museum. Émile Gallé and Louis Majorelle the representatives of Nancy School are the leading masters of art nouveau furniture. The peculiarity of their works is characterized by adding natural details representing plants and animals and the marquetry technique. The collection also includes works of the Czech drawing-artist Alphonse Mucha and decorative ironwork of the architect Hector Guimard.

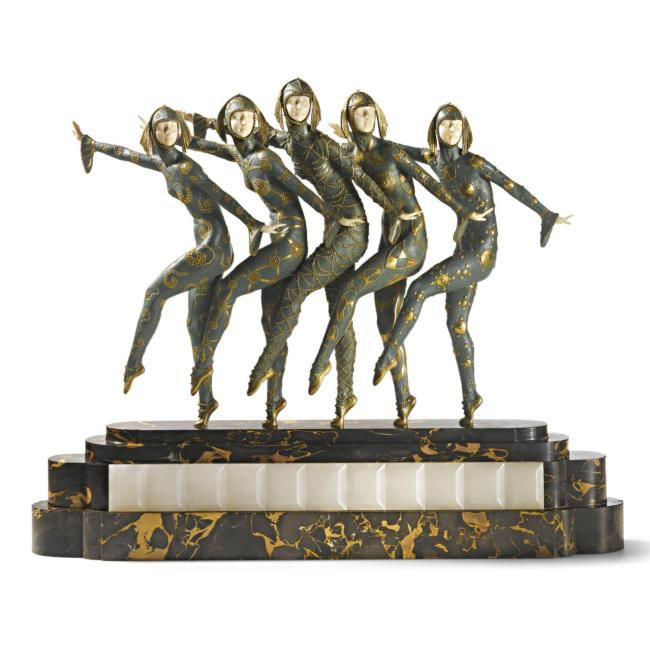
Demetre Chiparus (1886-1947). Girls. Bronze, patina, silver, ivory, pedestal made of quartz and marble.

== Scientific research and exhibition activities ==
A scientific research is permanently conducted under the Art Deco project. "Images of art deco" (Art Deco Gallery, Moscow, 2010). The project was devoted to works of the Russian artists of the first quarter of the 20th century working in the Art Deco style and who were closely connected with art life of Western Europe. The series of lectures named as "A barbarity inoculation: from the Russian ballets to Decorated style" took place within the exhibition. "Erté and the golden 20s" (Art Deco Gallery, Moscow, 2011–2012). The works of a past master of the Hollywood chic Romain de Tirtoff known to the world under a pen name Erté was presented at the exhibition.

"The Sergey Dyagilev's "Russian Seasons" and its impact on the Art Deco style" (The Art Nouveau and Art Deco museum, Salamanca 2011). The Project was organized by the Art Nouveau and Art Deco museum and showroom of Salamanca University with the assistance of the Manuel Ramos's as part of the Year of the cultural cooperation between Russia and Spain.

"Körperkultur. The Body culture in Germany and the USSR, 1910 — the 1930s" (Art Deco Gallery, Moscow, 2012 — 2013). The project was run within the Year of Germany in Russia. The exhibition comprised the Nikolay Zagrekov’s masterpieces, as well as pieces of the documentary photography taken from the German magazines and books which revealed the beauty of the human body, some rare photos of Meyerhold's biomechanics taken from the Bakhrushin Theatre Museum collection along with the sculptures from the personal Mkrtich Okroyan’s collection.
