= Etling =

Etling is a surname. Notable people with the surname include:

- Danny Etling (born 1994), American football quarterback
- Edmond Etling (1878–c. 1940), French art dealer, gallery owner, designer, and manufacturer of decorative objects

== See also ==
- Lake Carl Etling
