= École Supérieure des Beaux-Arts, Genève =

Art school part of Geneva University of Art and Design

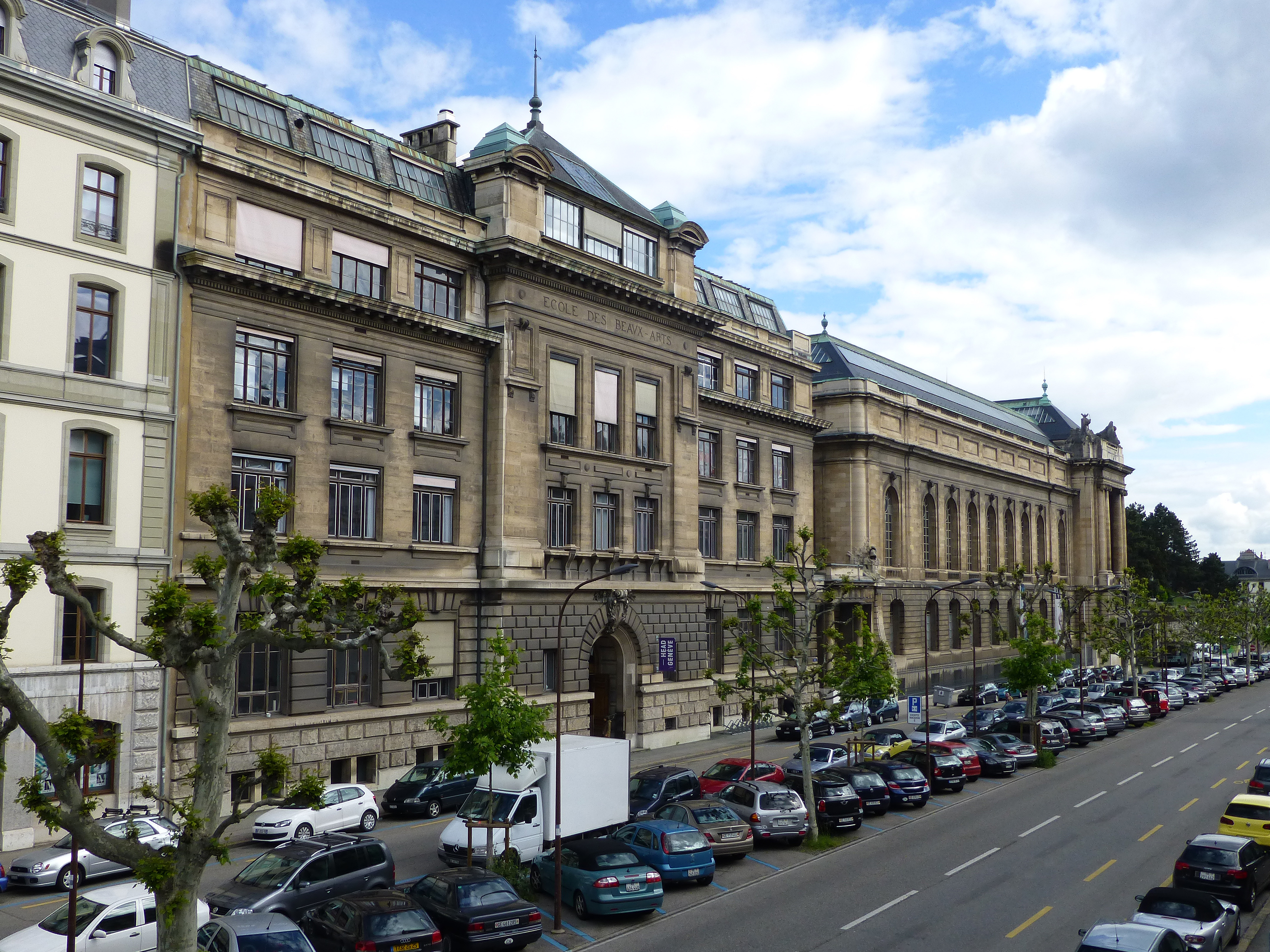
- The former campus of École Supérieure des Beaux-Arts; now part of the HEAD campus at Helvétique 9

Location
- Boulevard Helvétique 9, 1205, Geneva, Switzerland

Information
- Other names: École des Beaux-Arts de Genève, École Municipale des Beaux-Arts, École Publique de Dessin, Geneva School of Fine Arts
- Former names: École de Dessein, l'École Supérieure des Beaux-Arts de Genève (ESBA)
- Established: 1748
- Closed: 2006

École Supérieure des Beaux-Arts, Genève (English: School of Fine Arts, Geneva), was an art school founded in 1748 in Geneva, Switzerland. In 2006, the school was merged with the Geneva University of Art and Design (HEAD).

== History ==
The École Supérieure des Beaux-Arts was founded in 1748 by the Conseil des Deux-Cents under the name École de Dessein (English: Drawing School). Pierre Soubeyran, the Genevan-French engraver served as the director of the school from 1709 to 1775.

From 1826 to 1872, the school was located at place de Neuve (basement of the Musée Rath). From 1872 to 1903, the school was located at current rue du Général-Dufour (a school known as Grutli). After having occupied various locations in the city of Geneva, the school occupied the building on Boulevard Helvétique in 1903.

In 2001, it became the Geneva School of Fine Arts (ESBA), before merging in 2006 with the Geneva University of Art and Design (HEAD).

== Notable people ==
=== Alumni ===
- Silvia Bächli
- Marcel Bouraine
- Marie José Burki
- Constant Könz
- Pierre Le Faguays
- Max Le Verrier
- Carmen Perrin
- Romed Wyder

=== Faculty ===
- Marcel Bouraine
- Pierre Le Faguays
- Pierre Soubeyran
- James Vibert
