= Max Le Verrier =

French sculptor (1891–1973)

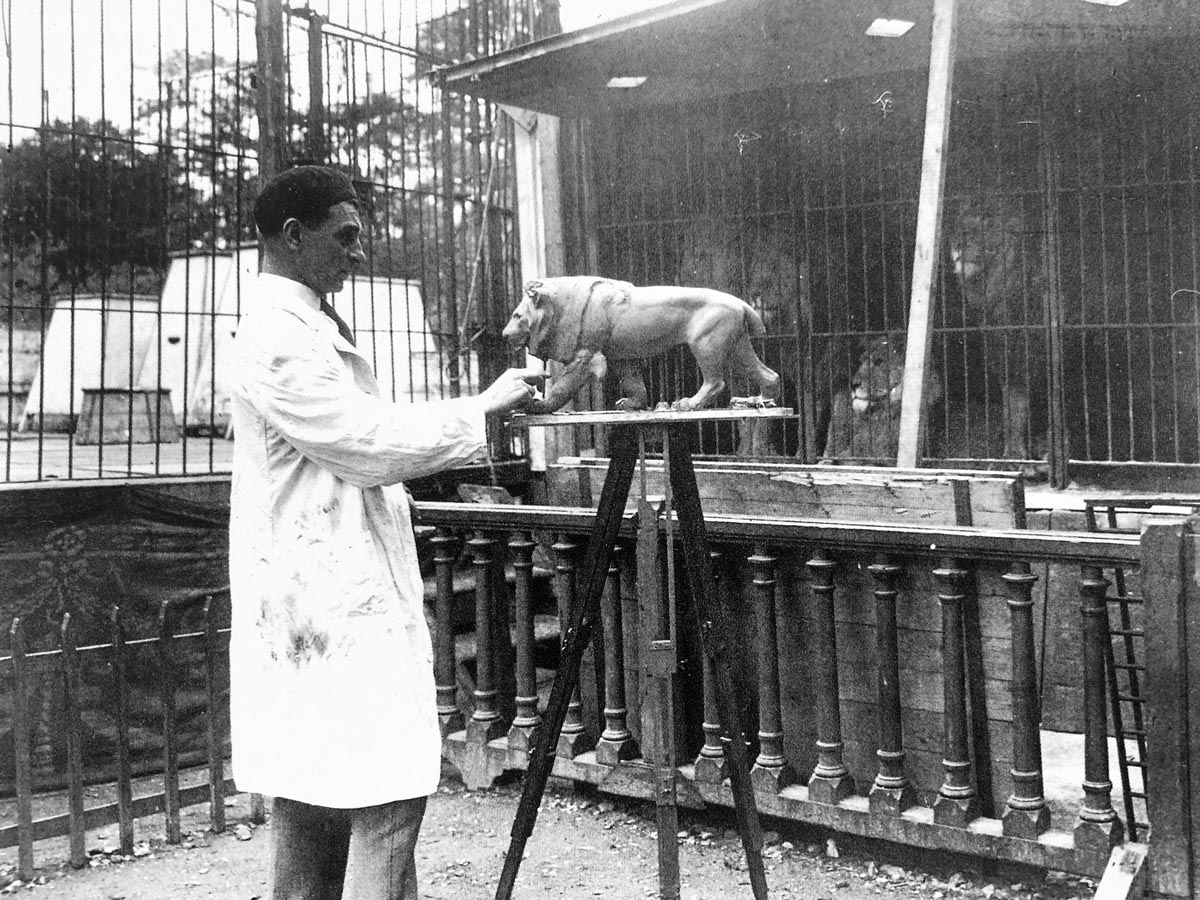
- Born: Louis Octave Maxime Le Verrier; 29 January 1891; Neuilly-sur-Seine, France
- Died: 6 June 1973 (aged 82); Paris, France
- Burial place: Fontenay-lès-Briis
- Other names: Artus, M. Le Verrier
- Education: École Supérieure des Beaux-Arts, Genève
- Spouse: Jeanne Hubrecht
- Children: 2

Signature
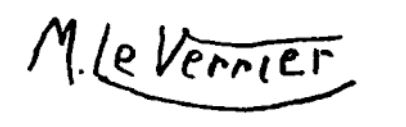

Louis Octave Maxime Le Verrier (1891–1973), known more commonly as Max Le Verrier, also known by the pseudonym Artus, was a French sculptor. He was known for being a pioneer within the Parisian Art Deco movement, creating decorative art objects often made in bronze as well as historical sculptures.

== Biography ==
Max Le Verrier was born on 29 January 1891 in Neuilly-sur-Seine, France to a French father who was a goldsmith and jeweler, and a mother from Belgium. His parents separated when he was a child and he spent a lot of time in boarding schools. He served as a pilot in the French Army during World War I.

Le Verrier attended Geneva University of Art and Design (formerly École Supérieure des Beaux-Arts, Genève), studying under Marcel Bouraine and Pierre Le Faguays. He returned to Paris by 1919.

In 1925, he showed his work at the Exposition internationale des Arts décoratifs et industriels modernes in Paris, where he won a gold medal. His first popular sculpture was a pelican in 1925. In 1921, Le Verrier married Jeanne Hubrecht, together they had two children. In the early 1920s, he inherited a small metal foundry and by 1926 he started making decorative objects in his own workshop.

During World War II, Le Verrier's house was used as a dead drop for the Resistance. He was arrested in 1944 for his connection to the resistance against Nazis. He was able to reopen studio after the war.

His workshop was located at 30 rue Deparcieux, and he had a small shop located at 100 rue du Théâtre in Paris. Le Verrier's studio created bronze lamps, ashtrays, bookends, desk sets, and hood ornaments; often featuring nude women or animals in an Art Deco style. He used a few different patina styles, included the notable "greenie" style, and often mounted them on Italian marble bases. Besides bronze, he also worked with ivory, zinc, terracotta, and ceramics. He also cast work for other sculptors, including Pierre Le Faguays, Marcel Bouraine, André Vincent Becquerel,,Charles Charles and Jules Edmont Masson.

== Death and legacy ==
Le Verrier died on 6 June 1973 in Paris.

His work can be found in public museum collections, including at the Musée d'Orsay. Le Verrier's great grandson Damien Blanchet continued to produce his sculptures after his death, under the name Maison Max Le Verrier.
