= Edmond Etling =

French art dealer, gallery owner, and manufacturer (c. 1878–1918)

- Born: Edmond Laurent Etling; 23 June 1878; Paris, France
- Died: 24 October 1918; Paris, France
- Occupations: Art dealer, gallery owner, designer, manufacturer
- Movement: Art Deco

Edmond Laurent Etling (23 June 1878 – 24 October 1918) was a French art dealer, gallery owner, designer, and a manufacturer of high-quality decorative objects made of bronze, ceramics and art glass in the Art Deco style.

He owned La Societe Anonyme Edmond Etling (English: Edmond Etling Limited Company) for manufacturing, his foundry was named Edmond Etling & Cie, and sometimes the products are referred to as "Etling Glass". His gallery, Galerie Béranger, was located in Paris, however there are discrepancies on the exact address.

== Biography ==
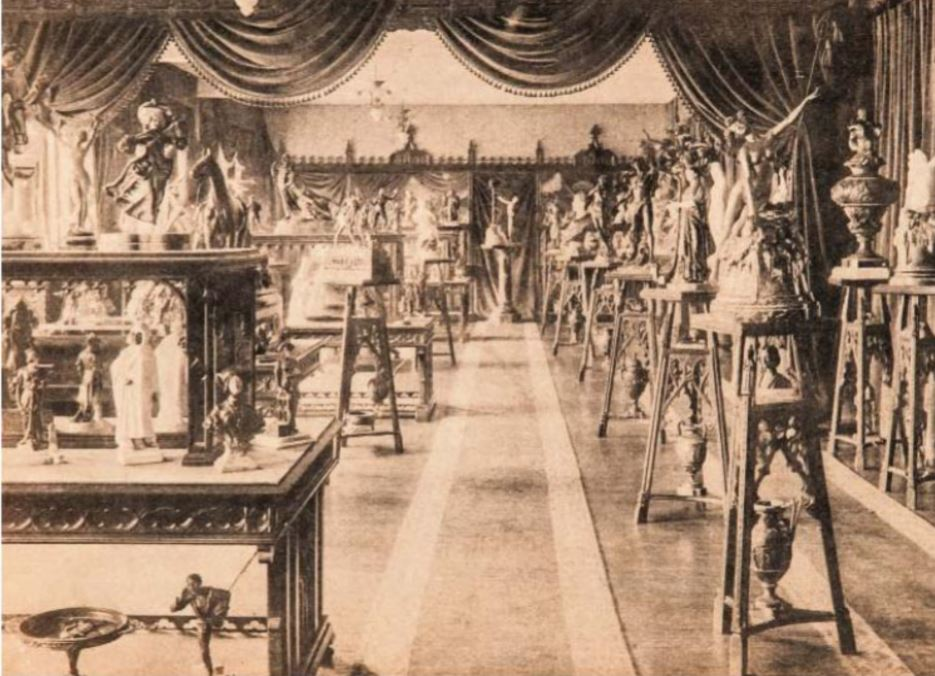
Galerie Béranger in Paris

Etling was born in Paris, 11, rue des Halles (1st district), the son of Cerf Etling and Valerie Dreyfus. His company La Societe Anonyme Edmond Etling, founded in Paris in 1909, manufactured decorative object and commissioned sculptors and artists, including Georges Béal, Demétre Chiparus, Claire Colinet, Armand Godard, Geneviève Granger, Marcel Guillard, Maurice Guiraud-Rivière, Géza Hiecz, Fanny Rozet, and Lucille Sévin. Other artists worked with Etling when casting their statuettes including Aurore Onu, Marcel Bouraine, Pierre Le Faguays, Raymonde Guerbe, and André Vincent Becquerel.

Etling is known for light blue opalescent objects such as plates and bowls, which were also produced in gray and frosted glass. Most items bore the cast signature "Etling France" followed by a model number related to the Choisy-le-Roi catalogue.

In 1910, Etling was awarded the diplome d'honneur at Brussels International (1910).

He was named a Knight of the Legion of Honor by decree of October 18, 1918. He died a few days later in Paris, 11th arrondissement, on the 24 October 1918.

In the 1970s, the Manufacture Royale de Porcelaine de Sèvres reproduced some Etling designs, particularly the female nudes.

== See also ==
- Art Deco in Paris
- International Exhibition of Modern Decorative and Industrial Arts
- Paris between the Wars (1919–1939)
- Joh. Loetz Witwe, art glass manufacturer
- Lalique
