= Fanny Rozet =

French sculptor (1881–1958)

- Born: Stéphanie Amélie Mismaque; 13 June 1881; Paris, Île-de-France, France
- Died: 9 March 1958 (aged 76); Versailles, Yvelines, Île-de-France, France
- Burial place: Père-Lachaise Cemetery
- Other names: Stéphanie Amélie Rozet, Fanny Rozat, Stéphanie Amélie Fanny Rozet, Amélie Philippe-Bautte
- Education: Beaux-Arts de Paris
- Occupations: Sculptor, designer
- Spouse: Albert Philippe
- Father: René Rozet

Fanny Rozet (1881–1958; née Stéphanie Amélie Mismaque), was a French sculptor. She was known for her Art Deco sculptures, decorative objects, and lamps. She was the first female student to attend L’École Nationale Supérieure des Beaux-Arts de Paris (ENSBA).

== Biography ==
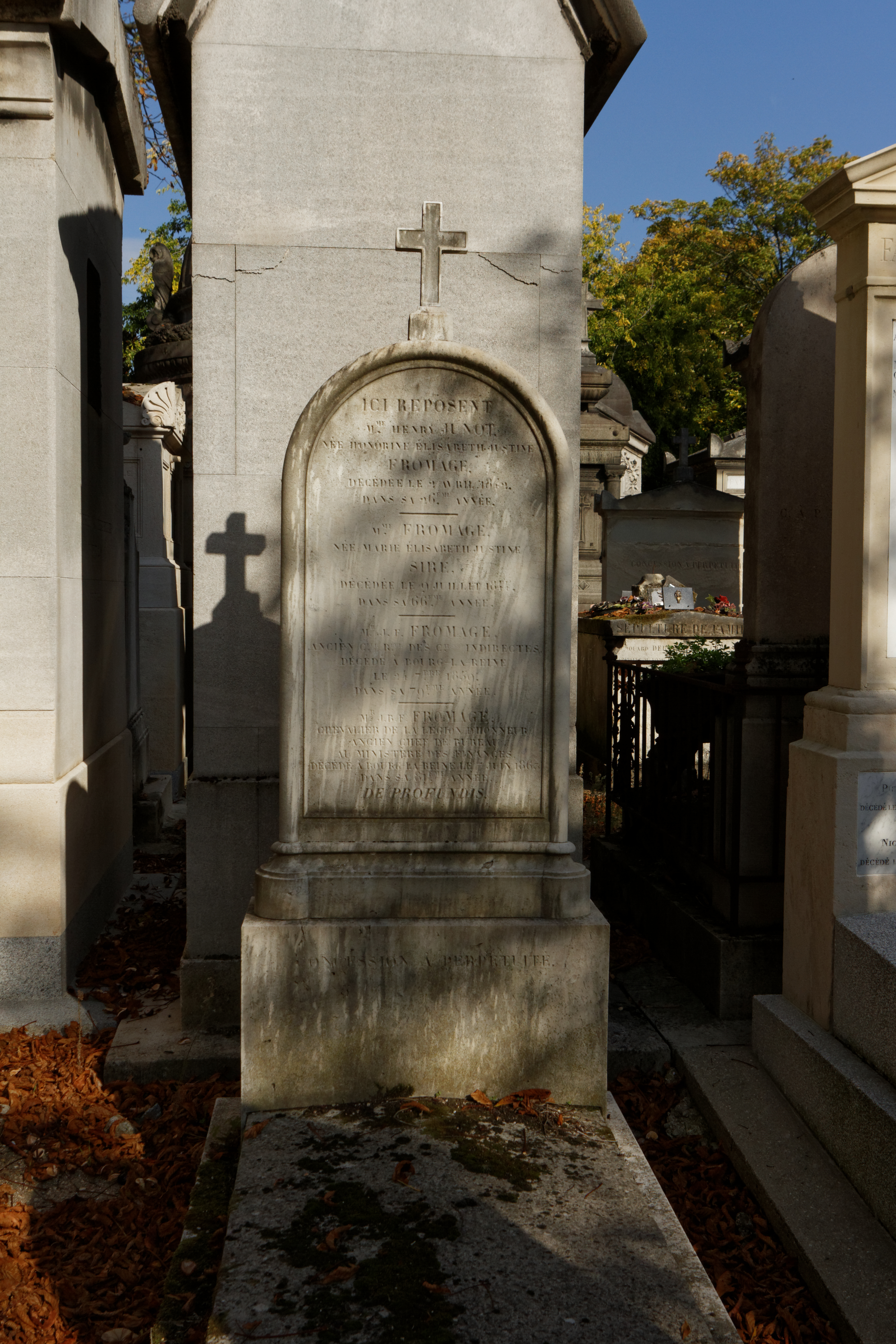
Image of her grave at Père-Lachaise cemetery in Paris

She was born on 13 June 1881, in Paris, Île-de-France, France. Her father was the sculptor René Rozet, who married her mother in 1895, fourteen years after her birth.

Rozet was a member of the Union of Women Painters and Sculptors (UFPS; French: Union des femmes peintres et sculpteurs). The UFPS demanded L’École Nationale Supérieure des Beaux-Arts de Paris (ENSBA; also known simply as Beaux-Arts de Paris) to allow Rozet to attend, because during this time women were not allowed entrance to the school. Rozet was the first female student to attend ENSBA in 1896, and there she studied under Laurent Marqueste.

Starting in 1904, she began exhibiting at Salon des Artistes Français. In 1905, she was accepted on a trial basis for the Prix de Rome (an organization which also did not have many female participants), however she did not go beyond the "preparatory examination".

Rozet created Art Deco statuettes, decorative objects, and lamps. Some of her artwork was manufactured by art publishers, including Arthur Goldscheider, Susse Frères, Eyffinger and Marquet, Edmond Etling, and Les Neveux de Jules Lehmann.

She died on 9 March 1958, in Versailles, Yvelines, Île-de-France, France.

The north wing in "La Casa Grande" at Hearst Castle contained on display a Rozet silvered bronze lamp, Cupid Jailed (c. 1920).
