= Pierre Le Faguays =

French sculptor (1892–1962)

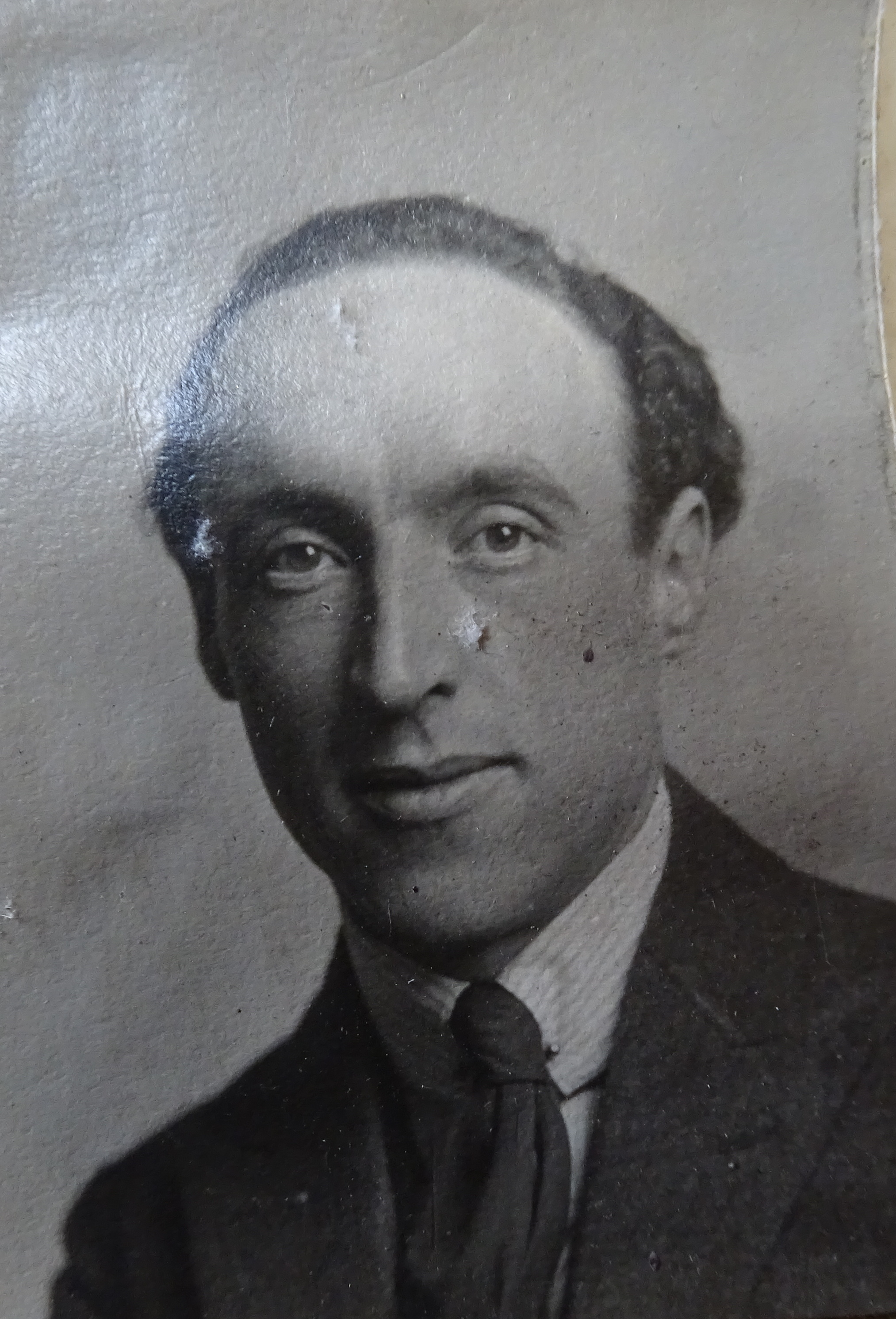
- Born: Pierre Camille Marie Le Faguays; 1892; Nantes, Pays de la Loire, France
- Died: 8 September 1962 (aged 69–70); Paris, Île-de-France, France
- Other names: Fayral, Guebre, Favral
- Education: École Supérieure des Beaux-Arts, Genève
- Occupation: Sculptor
- Movement: Art Deco
- Spouse: Raymonde Guerbe

Signature
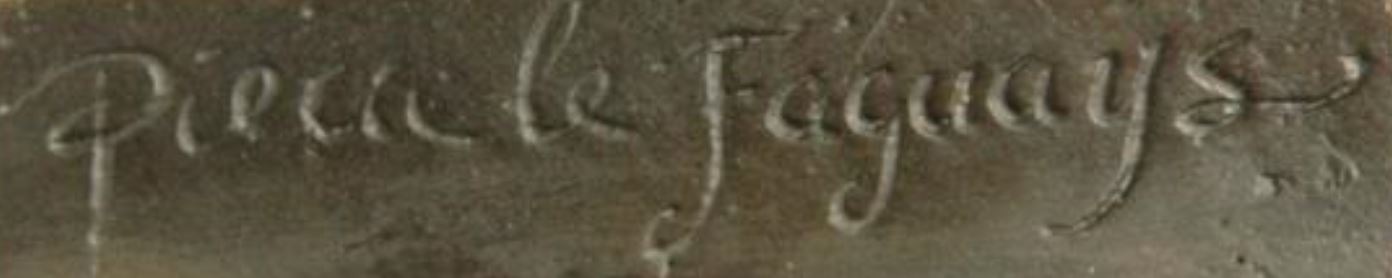

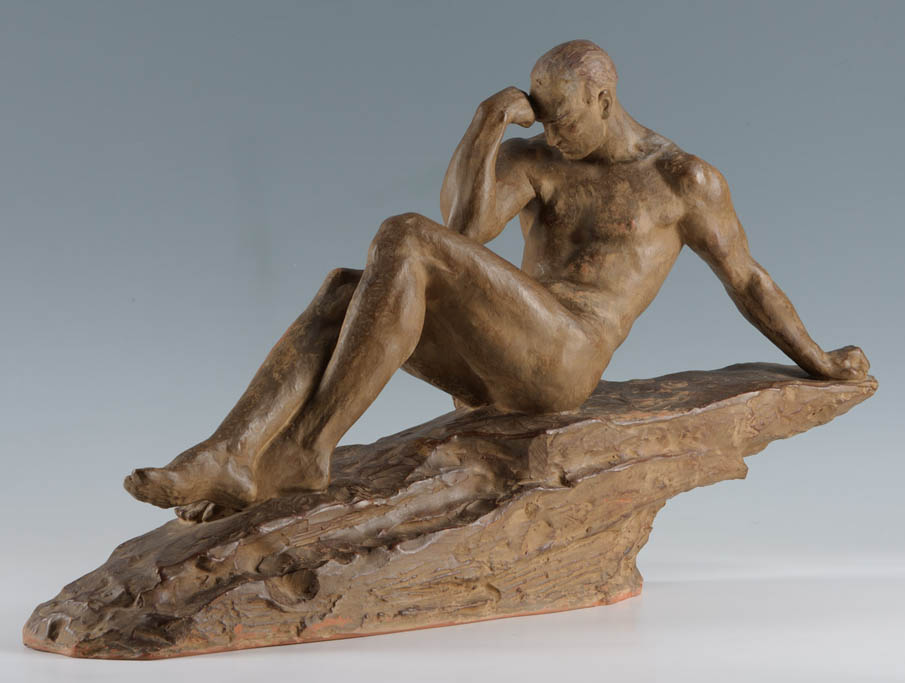
terracotta work (c. 1930) by Pierre Le Faguays

Pierre Camille Marie Le Faguays (1892–1962) was a French Art Deco sculptor. He also used the pseudonyms Fayral, and Guebre. Le Faguays made statuettes, lamps and decorative objects.

== Biography ==
Pierre Le Faguays was born in 1892 in Nantes, France. He was a student of James Vibert at the Geneva University of Art and Design (formerly École Supérieure des Beaux-Arts, Genève).

He was married to sculptor Andrée Guebre (also known as Raymonde Guerbe), they never had children. His wife had modeled for many of his works.

In 1922, he participated in exhibiting at the Salon des Artistes Français. He exhibited at the Salon d'Automne in multiple years; in 1926, a bust of his wife made in terracotta; and in 1931, a painted portrait of his wife.

He mostly worked with materials such as bronze, terracotta, pâte de verre, stone, zinc, wood, alabaster, wrought iron, and ivory. In Paris, Le Faguays had his statuettes made by the foundries Susse Frères, Edmond Etling, Max Le Verrier, Les Neveux de Jules Lehmann, M. Ollier and by the foundry of the Austrian Arthur Goldscheider, a son of Friedrich Goldscheider. In the 1960s, his work was extensively reproduced and were often signed as "Favral" or "Fayral".

Le Faguays work can be found in museum collections, including at the Musée d'Orsay, the Museum of Fine Arts, Houston, and the Casa Lis, in Salamanca.
