= Carmen Perrin =

Bolivian-born Swiss artist (b. 1953)

- Born: 9 January 1953 (age 73); La Paz, Bolivia
- Education: École Supérieure des Beaux-Arts, Genève
- Occupations: Visual artist, designer, educator, university department Chair
- Known for: Sculpture, public art
- Awards: Manor Cultural Prize (1988)
- Website: www.carmenperrin.com

Carmen Perrin (born 1953) is a Bolivian-born Swiss visual artist, designer, and educator. She has worked as a sculptor, site-specific artist, and printmaker, as well as worked in the design public garden spaces and public art in collaboration with architects. From 1989 to 2004, she was the university chair of her alma mater, École Supérieure des Beaux-Arts, Genève.

== Biography ==
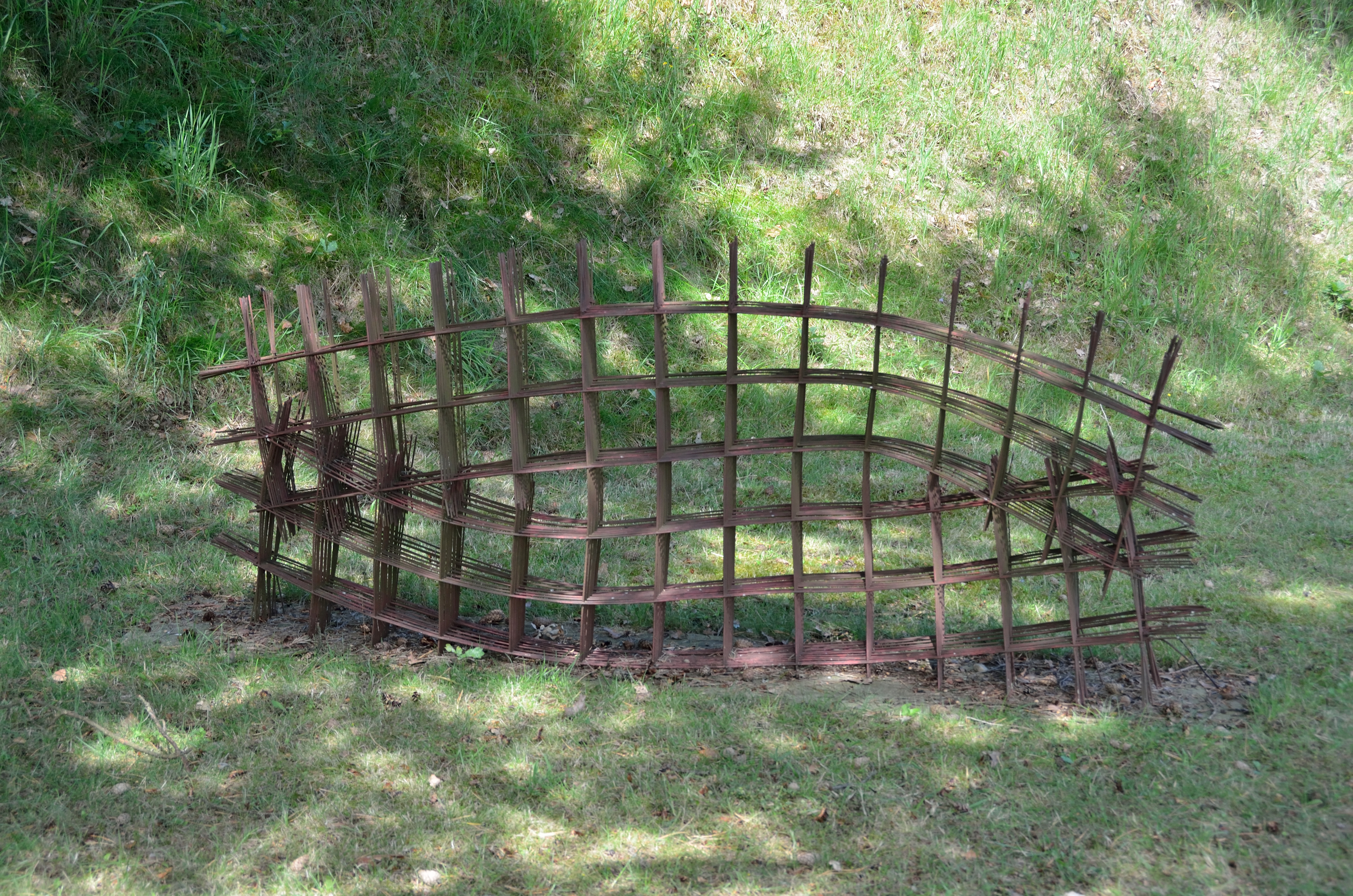
Untitled (1990) by Carmen Perrin in the Austrian Sculpture Park in Premstätten, Kalsdorf bei Graz

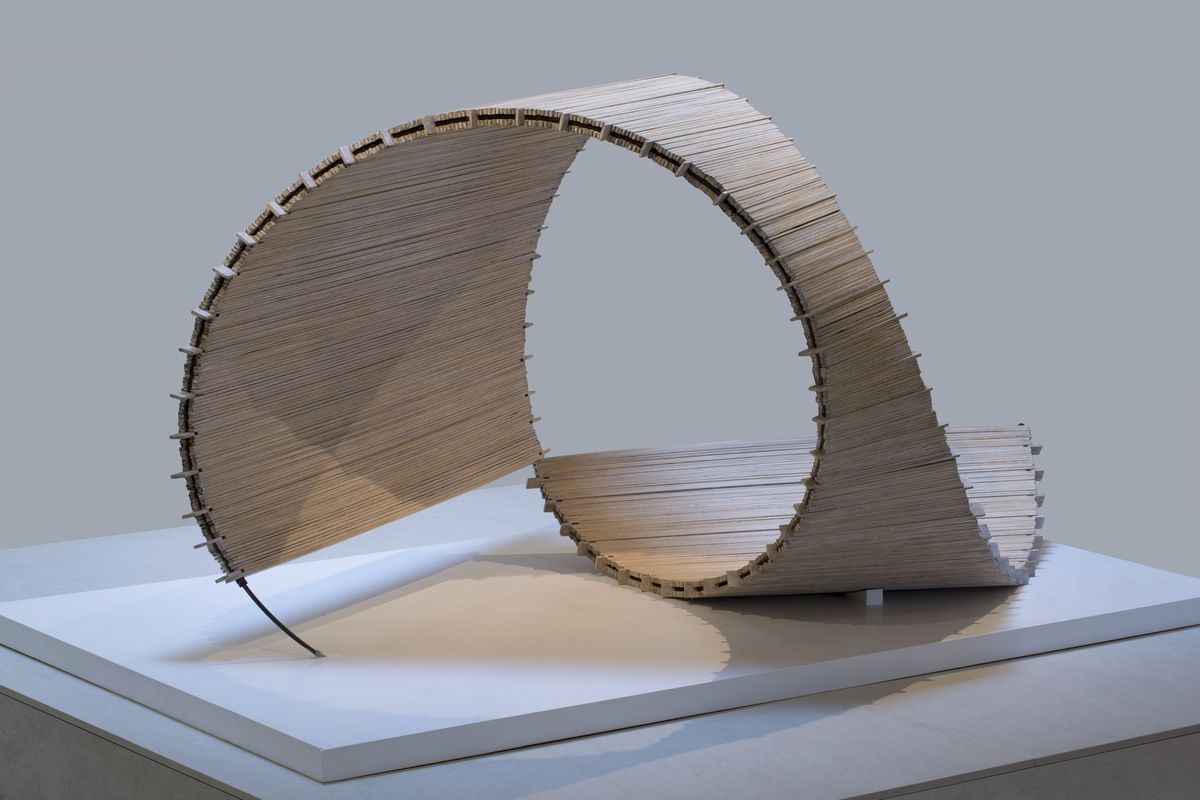
"Sculpture en ellipse" (1984) Museum of Fine Arts, Nancy

Carmen Perrin was born on January 9, 1953, in La Paz, Bolivia to Swiss parents. Her father is filmmaker, Alberto Perrin. In 1960, she moved with her family back to Geneva, Switzerland.

She attended École Supérieure des Beaux-Arts, Genève (the school has since been merged and re-named the Geneva University of Art and Design), where she graduated in 1980. Her early work was primarily sculptures made of industrial items (such as bricks, wire, rubber), which explored the physical materials and their interactions. After 1990, she began to work at a much larger scale and was considerate of the site of the work. In 1993, she had her debut solo exhibition in the United States at the Swiss Institute Contemporary Art New York.

She was awarded the Manor Cultural Prize (1988) for the Canton of Geneva; and the Trigon Prize ’89 from the Trigon Museum, Graz, Austria. Her work is in museum collections, including at the Museu d'Art Contemporani de Barcelona, and the Museum of Modern Art in New York City.
