= Franz Xaver Bergmann =

Viennese art manufacturer (1861–1936)

Franz Xavier Bergmann
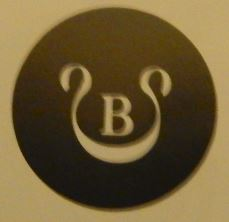
- Foundry seal. "B" in an urn-shaped cartouche
- Born: July 27, 1861; Vienna, Austrian Empire
- Died: January 1, 1936 (aged 74); Vienna, Austria
- Occupation: Factory owner

Franz Xavier Bergman(n) (July 27, 1861 – January 1, 1936) was the owner of a Viennese foundry who produced numerous patinated and cold-painted bronzes, Oriental, erotic, and animal figures, the latter often humanized or whimsical, humorous objets d'art.

== Early life and career ==
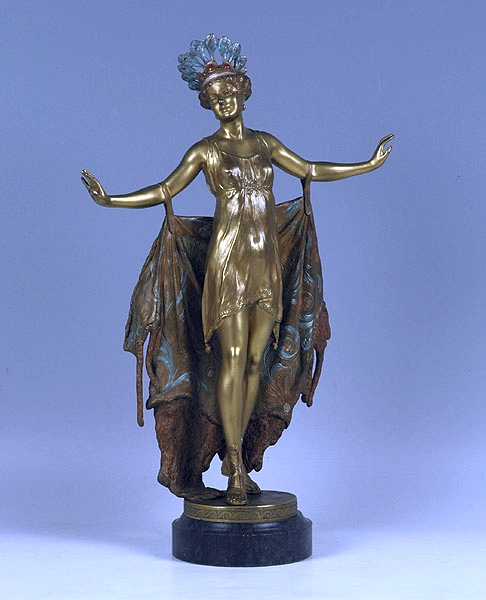
An erotic bronze sculpture cast by Bergmann, c. 1910

Bergmann was noted for his detailed and colorful work. He signed with either a letter 'B' in an urn-shaped cartouche or 'Nam Greb' – 'Bergman' in reverse. These marks were used to disguise his identity on erotic works.

His father, Franz Bergmann (September 26, 1838 – 1894), was a professional chaser from Gablonz who came to Vienna and founded a small bronze factory in 1860. Franz Xavier Bergmann inherited the company and opened a new foundry in 1900. Many of the bronzes from the 1900s were still based on designs from his father's workshop.

Bergmann is often incorrectly described as a sculptor, but he was not; he was a foundry owner. His workshops employed, on a temporary basis, many anonymous sculptors. Bruno Zach employed Bergmann to edit and cast some of his works, with some of the more erotic ones being signed as "Prof. Tuch", a pseudonym used by Zach. At the turn of the 19th century there were about fifty workshops producing Vienna bronzes.

'Cold-painted bronze' refers to pieces cast in Vienna and then decorated in several layers with so-called dust paint; the know-how for the mix of this kind of paint has been lost. The color was not fired, hence 'cold painted'. The painting was carried out mainly by women working at home, a typical cottage industry.

Sensuous poses of young women in the Art Nouveau style were disguised by a covering that revealed all when a button was pushed or a lever moved. Often carefully sculpted animals, such as bears, could be opened to reveal an erotic figure inside.

=== Foundry closure ===
The Bergmann foundry was closed in 1930 due to the Great Depression. It was reopened some years later by Robert Bergmann, son of Franz Xavier, and operated until his death in 1954, when the remaining stock and molds were sold to Karl Fuhrmann & Co.

== Trivia ==
The playwright Henrik Ibsen had a small group of such characters which he referred to as his "devil orchestra"; a black boy climbing up a ladder on an elephant (NF.1914-0491), a cat chewing another with rice twigs (NF.0490A), singing after sheet music (NF.0490B), writing (NF.0490C), directing (NF.0490D), devils pulling each other in a wheelbarrow (NF.0492) or carrying an inkwell between them (NF.0488) and a frog sitting on an ashtray playing on a lute (NF.0489). Ibsen used these as inspiration: "There should be Troll in what I write," he said. Some of the characters were reported missing from the exhibitions on October 6, 1980, and were never returned. The rest of them are safely preserved at the playwright's desk in Ibsenmuseet in Oslo.

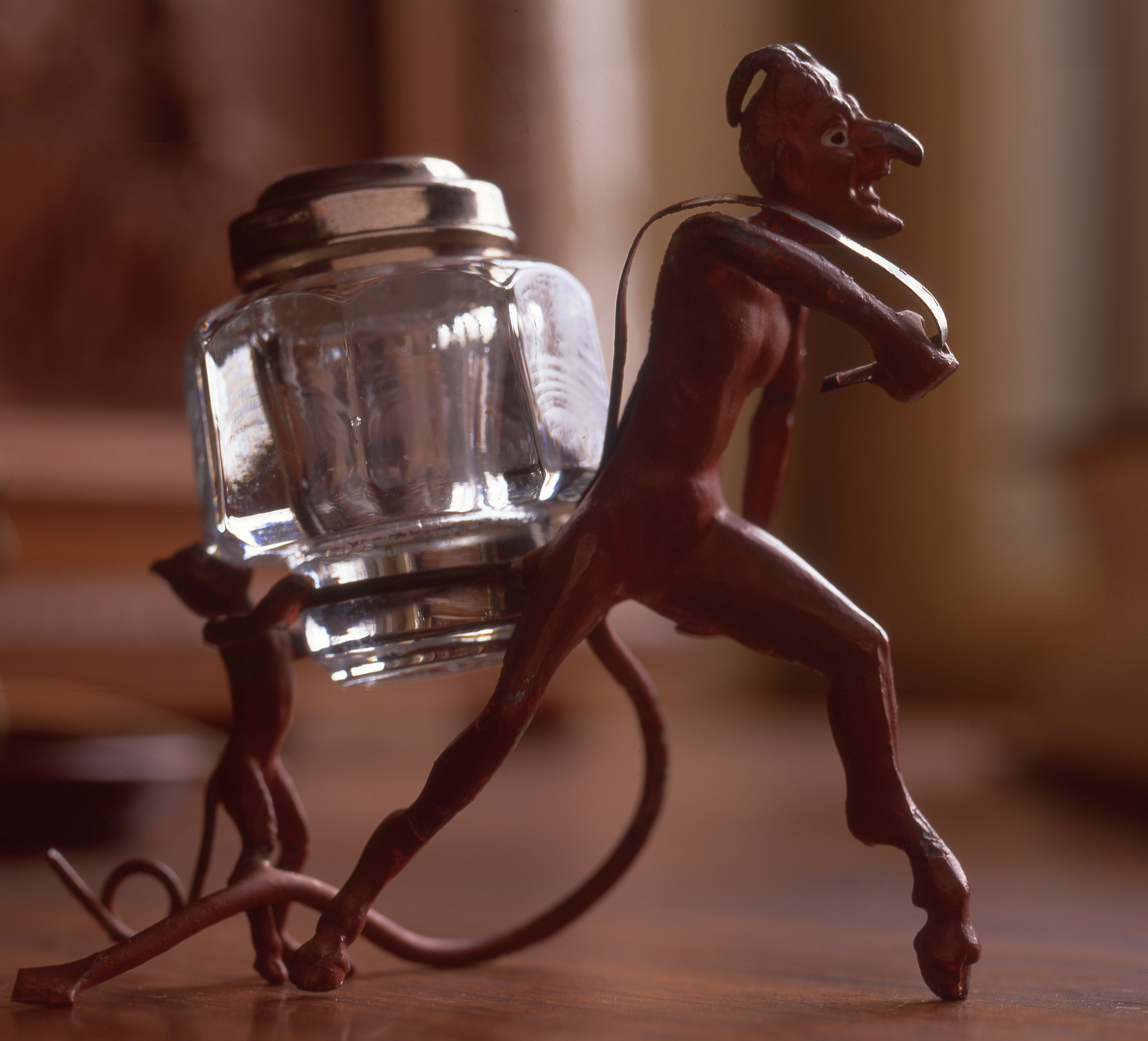
Two small devils carrying an inkwell between them. Norsk Folkemuseum, Ibsenmuseet (NF.1914-0488).

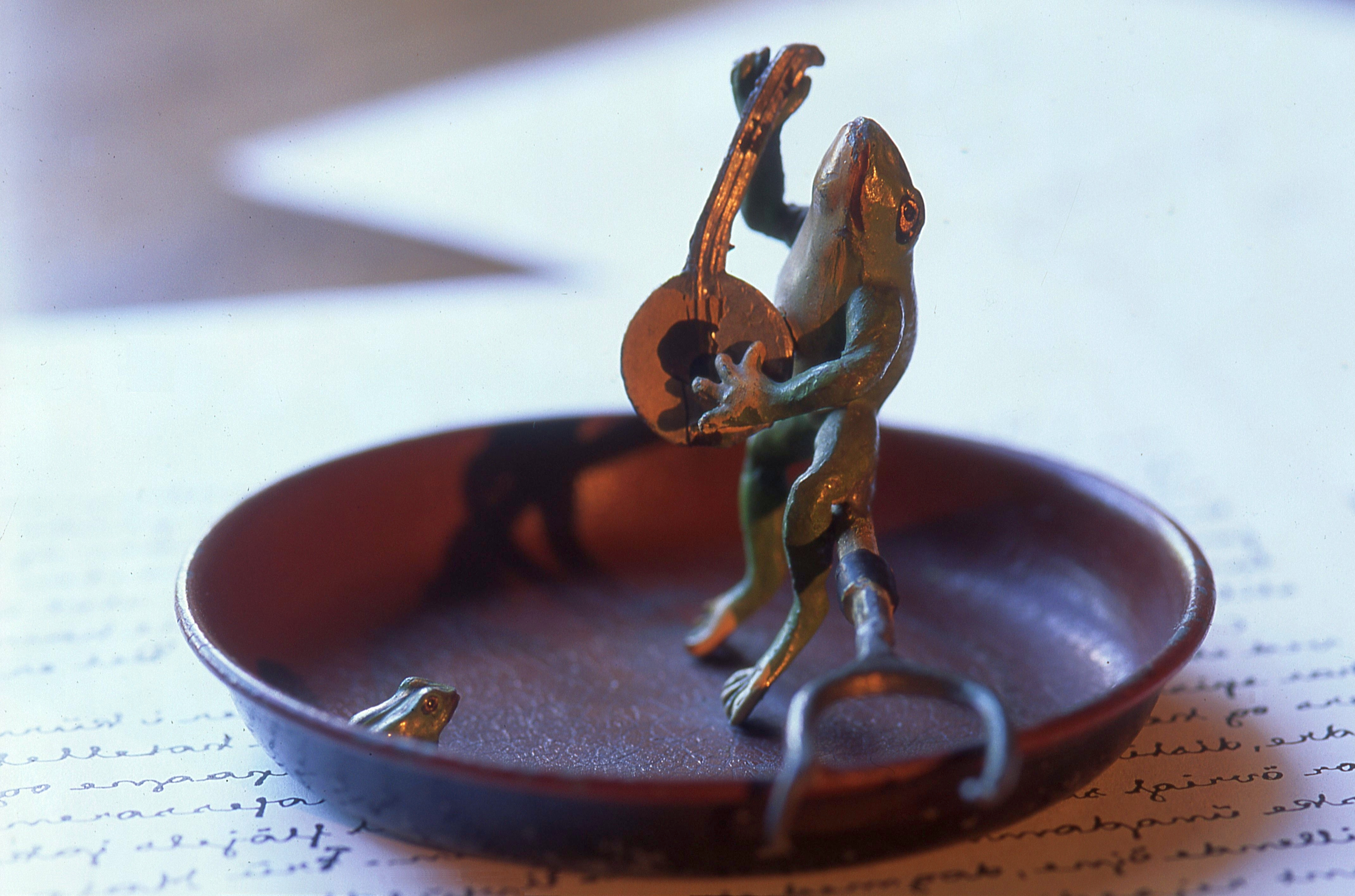
A frog sitting on an ashtray playing the lute. Norsk Folkemuseum, Ibsenmuseet (NF.1914-0489).

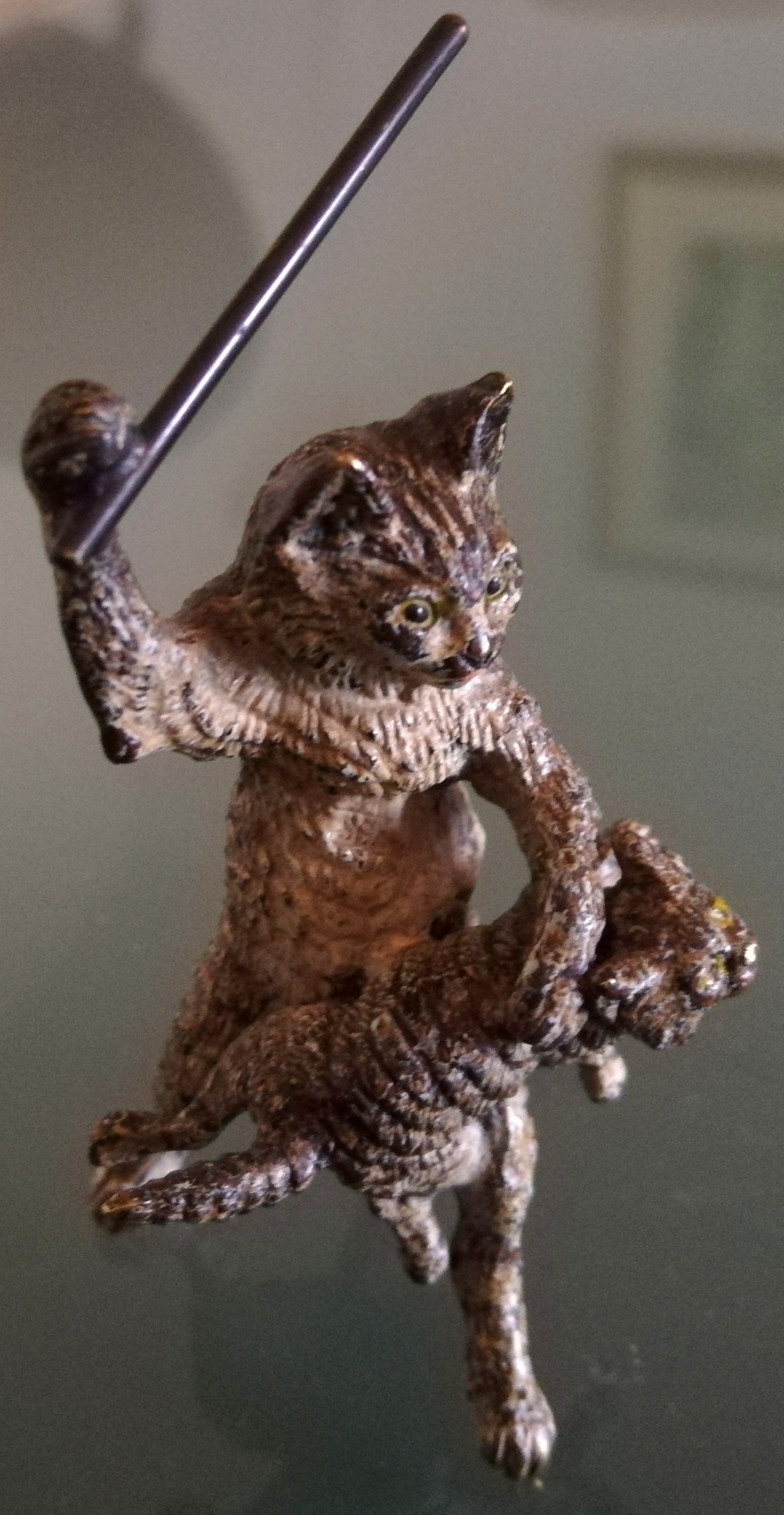
A cat chewing another with a rice twig. Norsk Folkemuseum, Ibsenmuseet (NF.2019-0541), identical to the lost figurine (NF.1914-0490A).

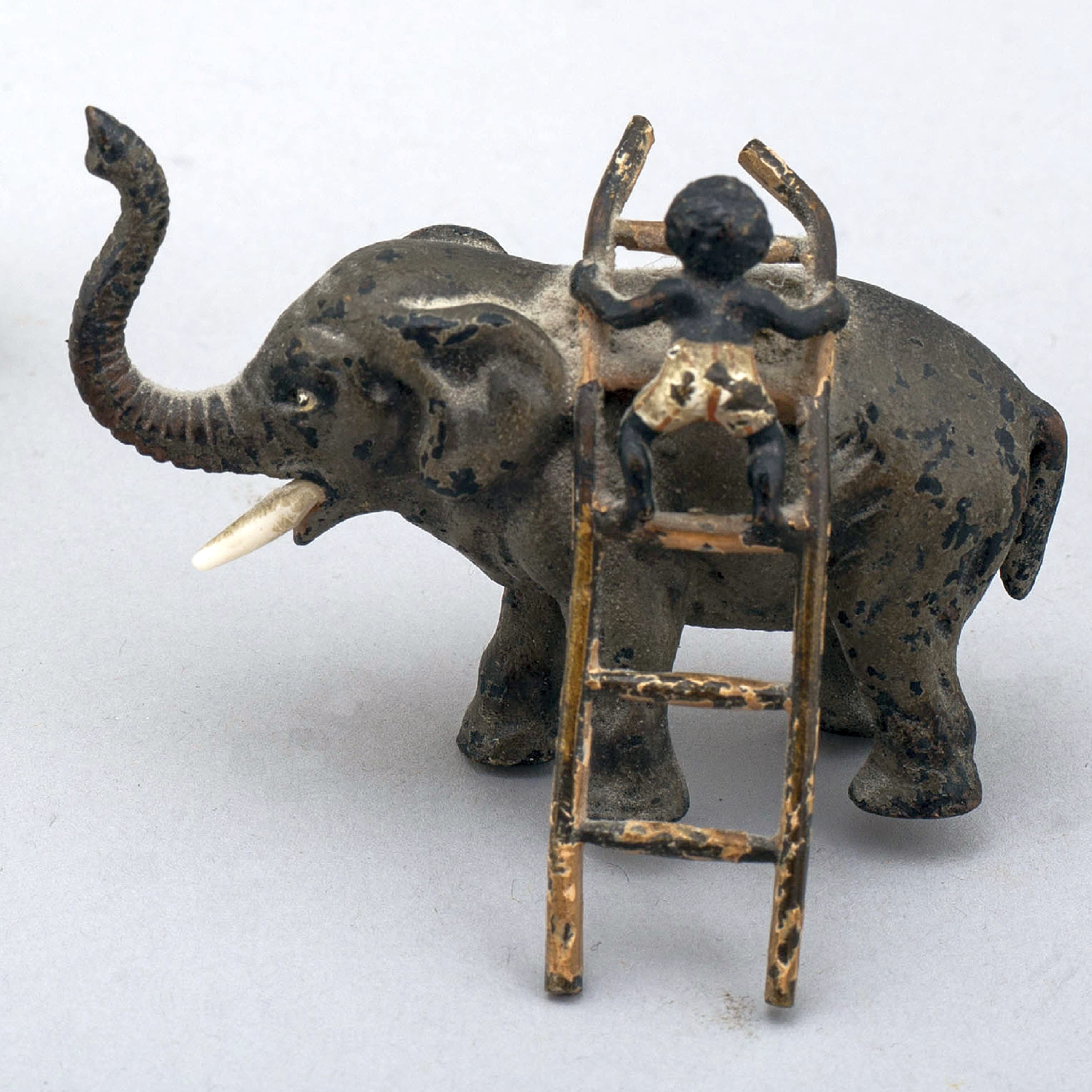
A black boy climbing up an elephant with a ladder. This one is just a bit different from the lost figurine (NF.1914-0491).
