= René Rozet =

French sculptor (1858–1939)

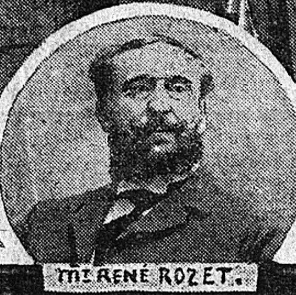
- Born: Auguste René Rozet; May 14, 1858; Paris, France
- Died: 1939
- Other name: René-Auguste Rozet
- Occupations: Sculptor, medalist
- Spouse: Diane Marie Mismaque (m. 1895)
- Children: 3, including Fanny Rozet

Auguste René Rozet (1858–1939) was a French sculptor and medalist. He produced portrait medallions, portrait busts, tympanum, and statuettes. A common subject of his work was children.

== Biography ==
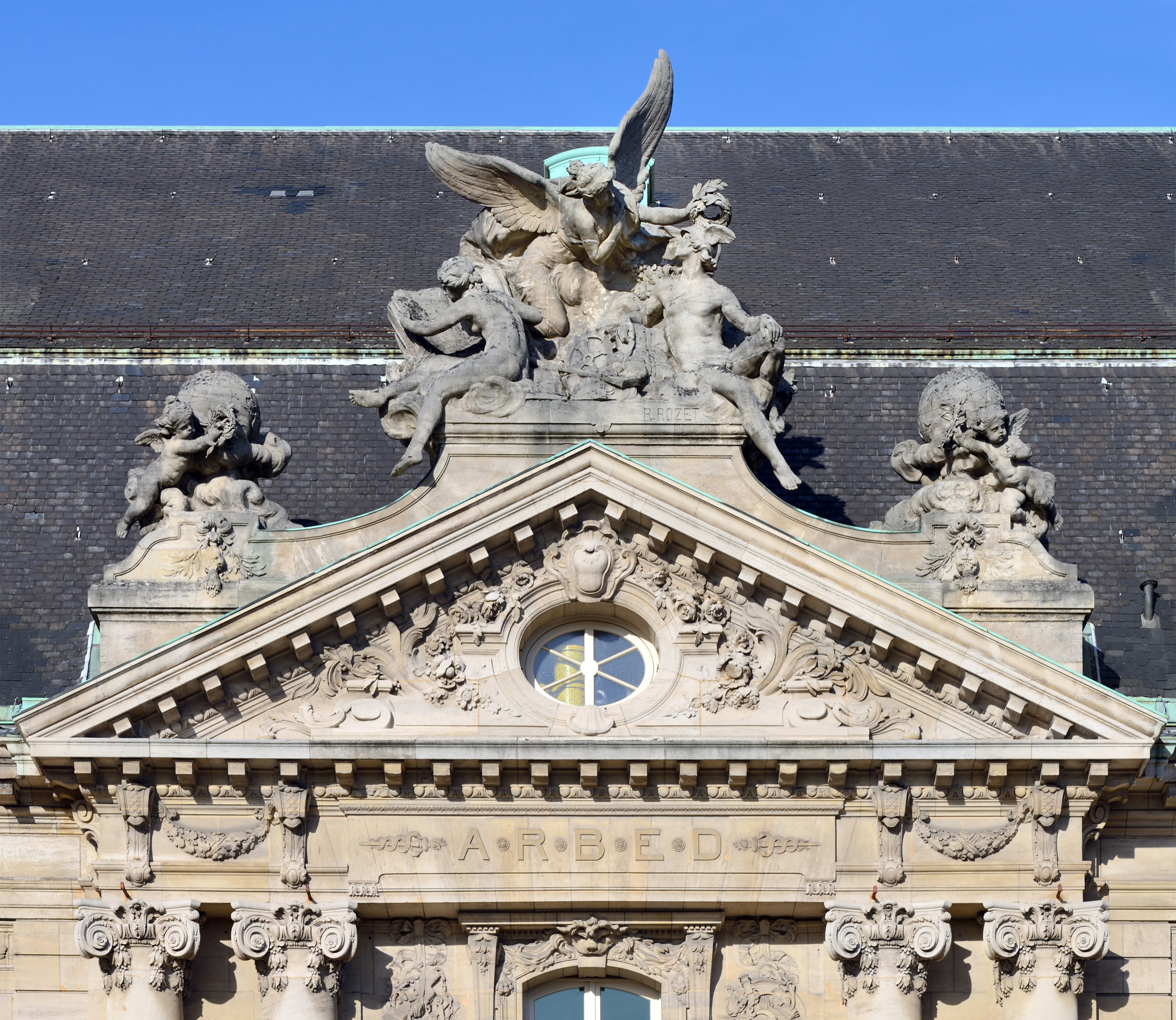
A building tympanum by artist René Rozet, found on the ARBED building in Luxembourg City

He was born on 14 May 1858 in Paris. Rozet studied with Pierre-Jules Cavelier, Charles Joshua Chaplin, Guillaume Charles Tasset, and Aimé Millet.

In 1905, he was elected as a member of the Académie des Beaux-Arts. In 1912, he was honored with the Legion of Honour award. In 1927, at the Salon des Artistes Français he won the Hors concours, a gold medal.

His work is in museum collections, including at the Musée d'Orsay, and Museum of Applied Arts.

His daughter was artist Fanny Rozet.
