= Josef Müllner =

Austrian sculptor

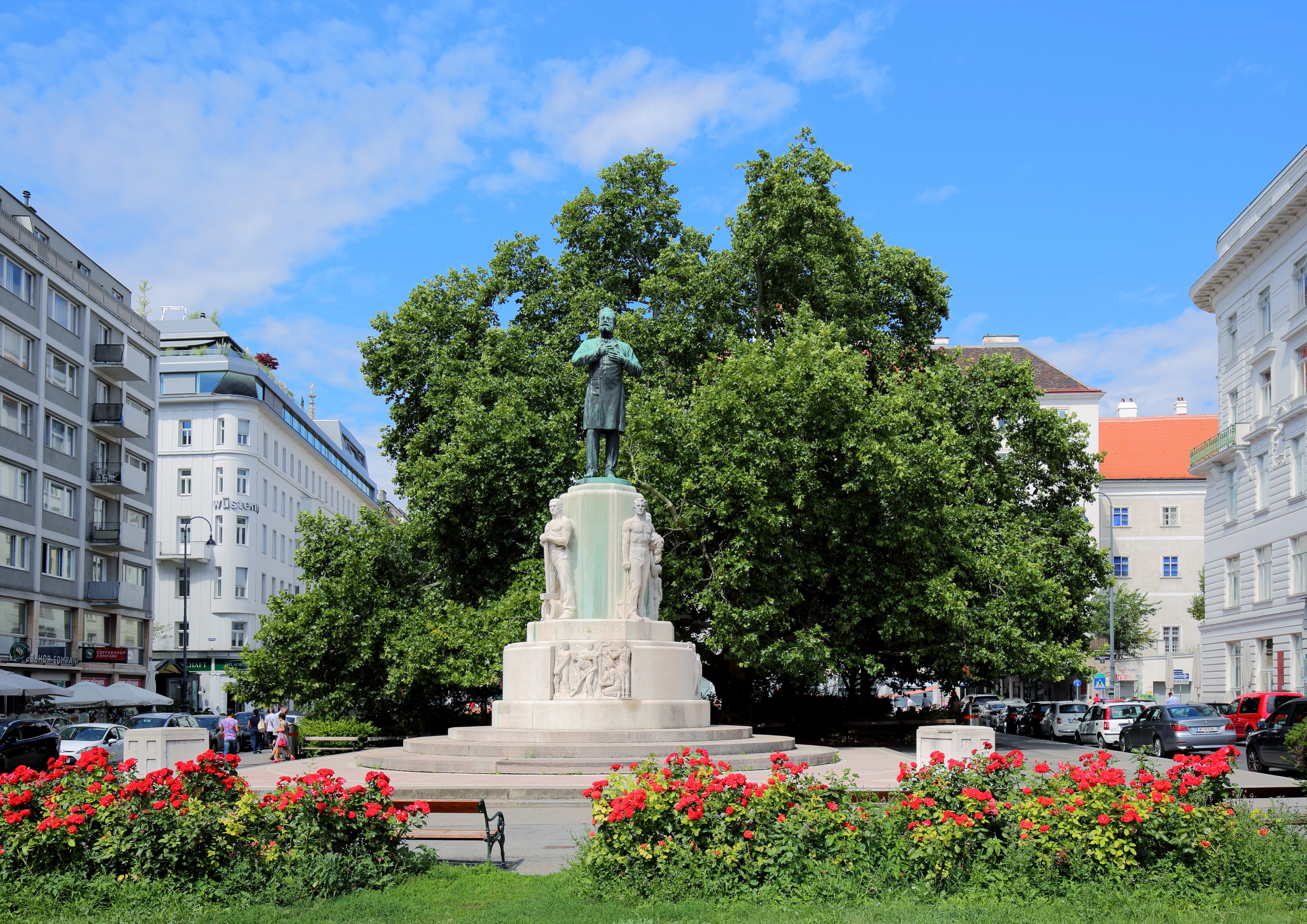
Josef Müllner's monument to Karl Lueger in Vienna

Josef Müllner (1 August 1879 in Baden near Vienna – 25. December 1968 in Vienna) was an Austrian sculptor, best known for his monumental sculptures such as the monument to Karl Lueger at Dr.-Karl-Lueger-Platz in Vienna. His work was part of the sculpture event in the art competition at the 1936 Summer Olympics. His students included, among others, Rudolf Schmidt and Bruno Zach.
