= Marie José Burki =

Swiss visual artist (born 1961)

- Born: 1961 (age 64–65); Biel, Switzerland
- Other names: Marie-José Burki, Marie Jose Burki
- Education: University of Geneva, École Supérieure des Beaux-Arts, Genève
- Occupations: Visual artist, educator
- Known for: Video art
- Spouse: Mitja Tušek
- Awards: Manor Cultural Prize (1993)

Marie–José Burki (born 1961) is a Swiss visual artist and educator. She is best known for video art, but also has worked in photography, screen printing, sculpture, and installation art. Her work is interested in exploring the interaction between words and images, the passing of time, and the narrative story. Burki teaches at Beaux-Arts de Paris. She lives between Brussels and Paris.

== Biography ==
Marie José Burki was born on 11 January 1961 in Biel. She attended the University of Geneva, where she studied French literature and history. She later attended the École Supérieure des Beaux-Arts, Genève. She is married to Mitja Tušek.

Burki has collaborated on artwork with her spouse Tušek (born 1961) and Éric Lanz (born 1962). Burki and Lanz formed the art collective Bel Veder, and joined the Gen Lock association. In 1986, Burki and Lanz had their first large exhibition at the Centre Culturel Suisse in Paris.

From 1989 to 1990, she had a one year art residency at MoMA PS1; and took part in the related group exhibition, National and International Studio Artist Exhibition Series 1989–1990 (from 1989 to 1990) at the Museum of Modern Art (MoMA). In 1993, Burki was awarded the Manor Cultural Prize for the Canton of Geneva. Burki's first major solo exhibition took place in 1995 at the Kunsthalle Basel. Her first solo exhibition in the United States was at Lehman Maupin gallery in 1998; which featured the video installation of Exposure: Dawn, 1997.

She taught art at the École nationale supérieure des beaux-arts de Lyon. From 2003 to 2008, Burki was professor of video art at the University of Fine Arts of Hamburg (German: Hochschule fur Bildende Kunste, Hamburg).

== Artwork ==
Her early video art work, Celui qui a vu passer les éléphants blancs (English: He Who Saw the White Elephants Pass By) (1985, runtime: 11 minutes) won film festival awards, and is held in video collection libraries (Kunsthaus Zürich; and Centre pour l'Image Contemporaine, Saint-Gervais, Geneva).

Her large scale, multi-channel video work on different walls, Exposure: Dawn (1997, runtime: approx. 20 minutes), features storefront prostitutes in a red-light district with cars passing and reflections of light. Burki's single channel video, Chicken (2000, runtime: 6 minutes), features a chef preparing a dead chicken for a meal.
