= Bruno Zach =

Austrian art deco sculptor (1891–1935)

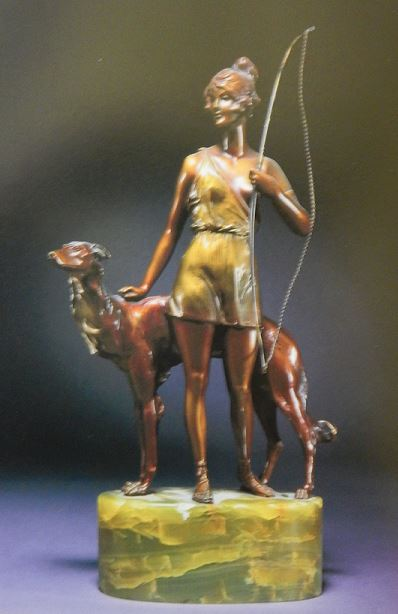
- A polychromed bronze sculpture by Zach of a female hunter and a Borzoi hound on a Brazilian green onyx plinth (c. 1920)
- Born: 6 May 1891; Zhytomyr, Volhynian Governorate, Russian Empire
- Died: 20 February 1935 (aged 43); Vienna, Republic of Austria
- Known for: Sculpture
- Notable work: The Riding Crop, 1925; The Hugger, c. 1930
- Movement: Art Deco; Art Nouveau
- Patrons: Art Deco Museum

Bruno Zach (6 May 1891 – 20 February 1935) was an Austrian art deco sculptor of Ukrainian birth who worked in the early-to-mid 20th century. His output included a wide repertoire of genre subjects; however, he is best known for his erotic sculptures of young women.

== Early life ==
Bruno Zach (Note: Zach's surname is often spelled incorrectly as "Zack" in some sources.) was born in Zhytomyr, Ukraine, on 6 May 1891. He emigrated to Austria as a young man and studied at the Vienna Academy under sculptors Hans Bitterlich (1860–1949) and Josef Müllner (1879–1968). His styles included Art Deco, Art Nouveau, sporting, and orientalism. His oeuvre would generally be considered decorative if not for his success in producing erotic sculpture.

== Career ==
Zach became a prolific creator of sculptures featuring tall, athletic, dominating women in bronze and ivory, the combination of the two in art casting sometimes being referred to as “chryselephantine”. He most often signed as "B. Zach" or "Bruno Zach", however a number of his pieces were signed with his pseudonyms, being "Prof. Tuch", "Professor Tuch" or "K. Salat". His erotica sculptures usually featured sexy, dreamy, scantily clad mistresses in stockings, garters, and high heels.

One of his better-known sculptures is the sado-masochistic The Riding Crop. Original period castings of this sculpture have sold for as much as $151,849, one such sale having taken place at the Bonhams auction house in Knightsbridge on 23 November 2011. According to Bonhams' director of decorative arts, Mark Oliver, "the demand for his work just grows and grows".

One of Zach's more controversial sculptures, created circa 1930, was his extremely erotic piece entitled The Hugger. The sculpture depicts a woman hugging a larger-than-life penis. Zach frequently portrayed the seedy side of nightlife in Berlin with many of his sculptures which often featured prostitutes.

His bronze sculptures were generally fired and coated with chemical patinas in mid-brown colours, but were sometimes cold painted or polychromed. His used ivory sparingly, and it was generally well-carved. Zach's work was edited by several firms, including Argentor-Werke (Vienna), Broma Companie, S. Altmann and Company, and Franz Bergmann.

== Death ==
Zach died in Vienna, Austria, on 20 February 1935.

== Literature ==
- Davenport's Art Reference & Price Guide, 2007/2008 Edition – ISBN 978-1-933295-18-3.
- Romeo and Juliet in Zhytomyr words, 2016 -
- Житомирська сторінка кохання скульптора Бруно Зака -
