= Paul Philippe =

French sculptor

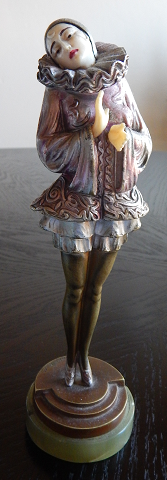
- Pierrette, c. 1922, a chryselephantine polychromed bronze sculpture by Philippe
- Born: Paul Philippe; 1870; France
- Died: 1930 (aged 59-60); France (presumably)
- Known for: Sculpture
- Notable work: Awakening, c. 1925
- Movement: Art Nouveau, Art Deco
- Patrons: Art Deco Museum

Paul Philippe (1870–1930) was a French sculptor who worked during the late 19th and early 20th century. His work primarily consisted of bronze sculptures done in the Art Nouveau and Art Deco genres.

Philippe is perhaps best known for his circa 1925 sculpture called Awakening. His full body of work, however, consists of dozens of models.

== Early life and education ==
Philippe was born in France circa 1870. He studied at the École des Beaux-Arts in Paris, France, under the direction of Antonin Larroux (1859–1913).

== Career ==
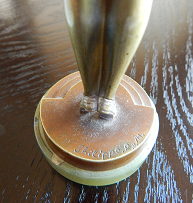
A signature example for Philippe

He specialized in bronze and chryselephantine sculptures that featured young women. A number of the pieces he created were of figures in the nude which was popular during the era he worked in. He worked for a time in Berlin, sometimes employing the Rosenthal und Maeder (R.U.M.) and Preiss-Kassler foundries to cast his work.

Philippe is perhaps best known for his circa 1925 sculpture entitled Awakening, although his oeuvre consists of a large body of work. Awakening features a young nude woman stretching as she awakens from a long night's sleep.

Philippe's work is exhibited in the Art Deco Museum in Moscow, Russia, one of the newest museums in the city, which opened in 2014. His work is also a part of other major collections and often appears for sale at major auction houses around the world, sometimes selling for hefty sums.

== Death ==
Philippe died in 1930, but the location of his death is unknown.
