= Jean Dunand =

French artist (1877–1942)

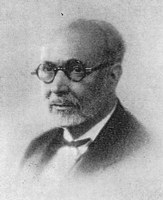
Undated portrait photograph of Jean Dunand

Jean Dunand (20 May 1877 – 7 June 1942) was a Swiss and French painter, sculptor, metal craftsman and interior designer during the Art Deco period. He was particularly known for his lacquered screens and other art objects.

== Biography ==
Jules-John Dunand was born on 20 May 1877 in Lancy, Switzerland. He later adopted the French first name of Jean, and became a naturalized French citizen in 1922. At the age of fourteen, he began studying sculpture at the Geneva School of Industrial Arts, where he won several prizes and received his diploma. In 1897 he moved to Paris and began to work as a sculptor and a copper craftsman. He participated in the 1904 Salon of the National Society of Fine Arts, and in 1905 he was selected a member, after completing an interior for the Countess de Bearn. He worked with a very wide range of materials, including steel, copper, pewter and silver, which he worked with hammer and glided, and encrusted with gold or mother-of-pearl, and then often decorated with enamels and patinas. His works included vases, plates, boxes, and jewelry.

In about 1912, he began working with Seizo Sugawara, a Japanese lacquer painter who had emigrated to France, and began to use that ancient and almost forgotten technique in his own work, making large decorative panels and screens. He also sometimes decorated pieces of furniture by other designers, including Jacques-Emile Ruhlmann and Pierre Legrain. His themes were greatly varied, from floral and animal designs, to a kind of neo-cubism, to oriental designs.

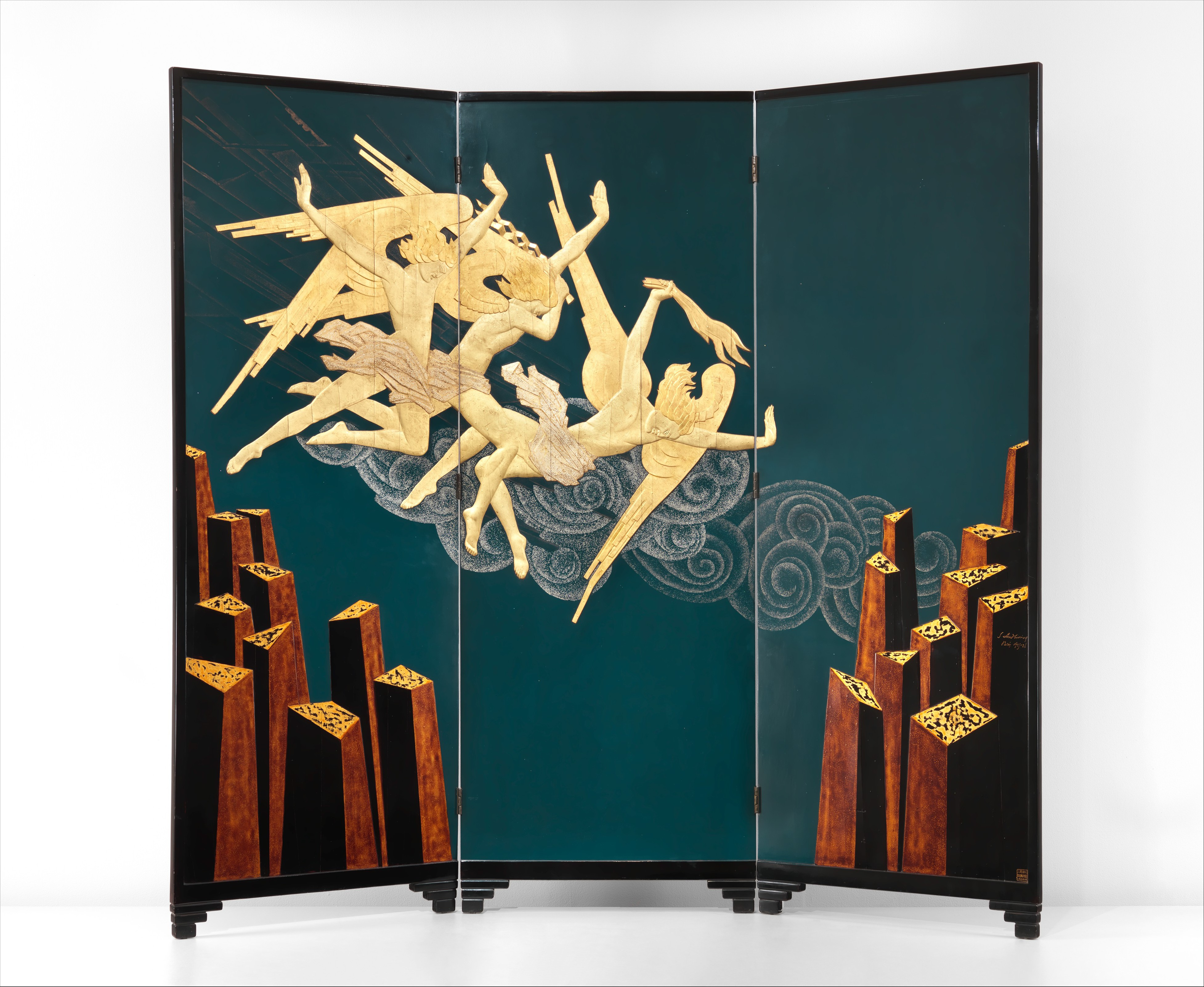
Jean Dunand, Fortissimo (1924–26), screen of lacquered wood, eggshell, mother-of-pear, and gold leaf. (Metropolitan Museum of Art).

For the 1925 Paris Exposition of Decorative Arts, he worked on one of his best-known exhibits, a proposal for the interior of an Art Deco French Embassy, creating a smoking room entirely decorated in lacquered panels. He also contributed to Ruhlmann's House of a Collector. He contributed to the interiors of many apartments, and of ocean liners; he decorated the smoking room of the ocean liner SS Normandie.

He died on 7 June 1942 in Paris.

His works can be found in museums in Amsterdam, Denver, Detroit, Geneva, Lausanne, Le Havre, London, Miami, Minneapolis, New York, Paris, Pittsburg, Quimper, Reims, Richmond, San Francisco, Tokyo and Zurich.

== Gallery ==
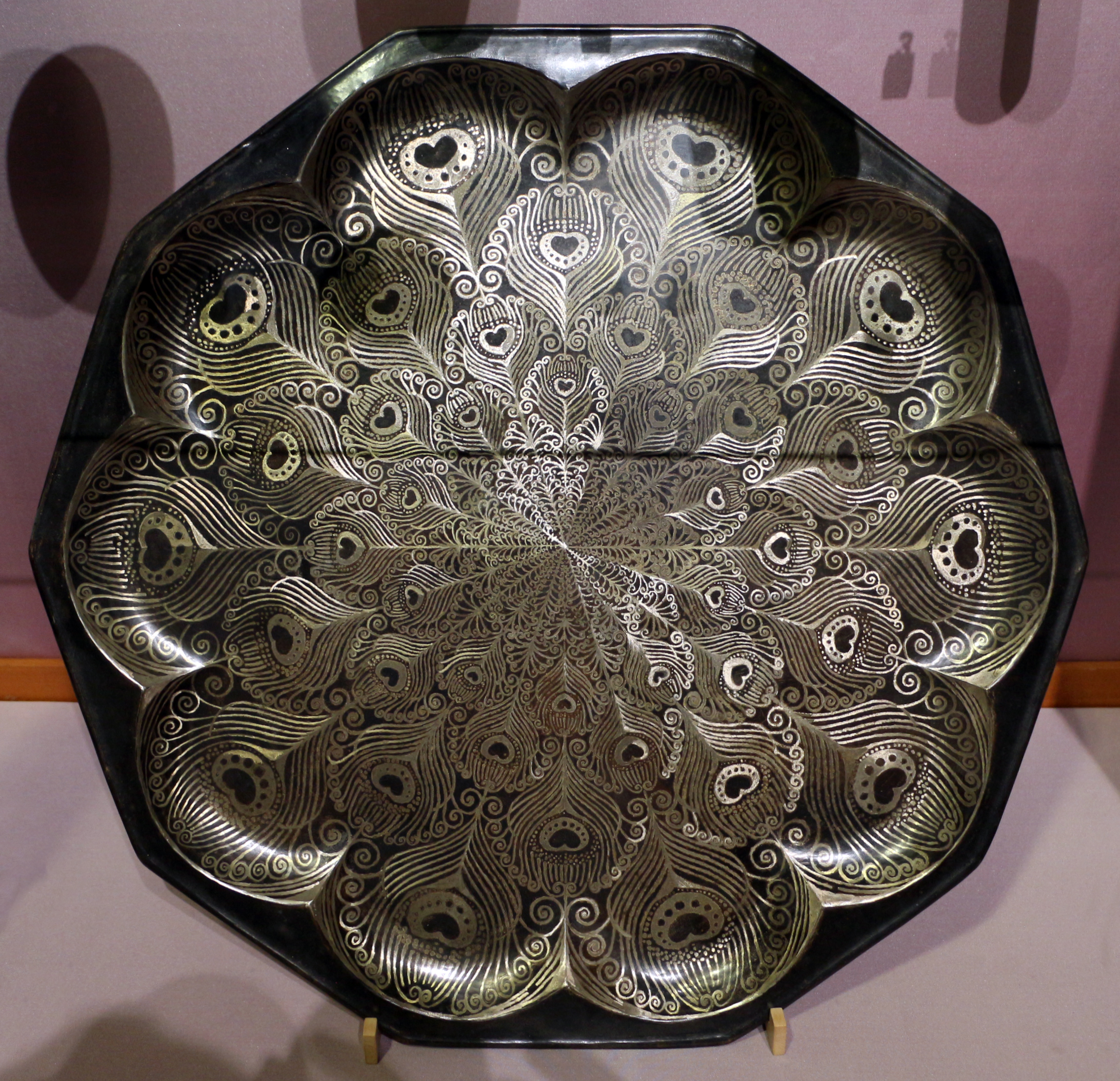
Jean Dunand, Peacock tray, nickel and silver in a peacock feather design, (1914), Musée d'Orsay, Paris.

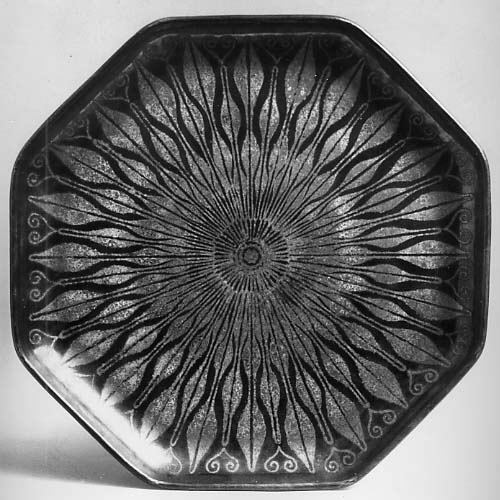
Jean Dunand, Tray of copper inlaid with silver, about 1920 (Metropolitan Museum of Art).

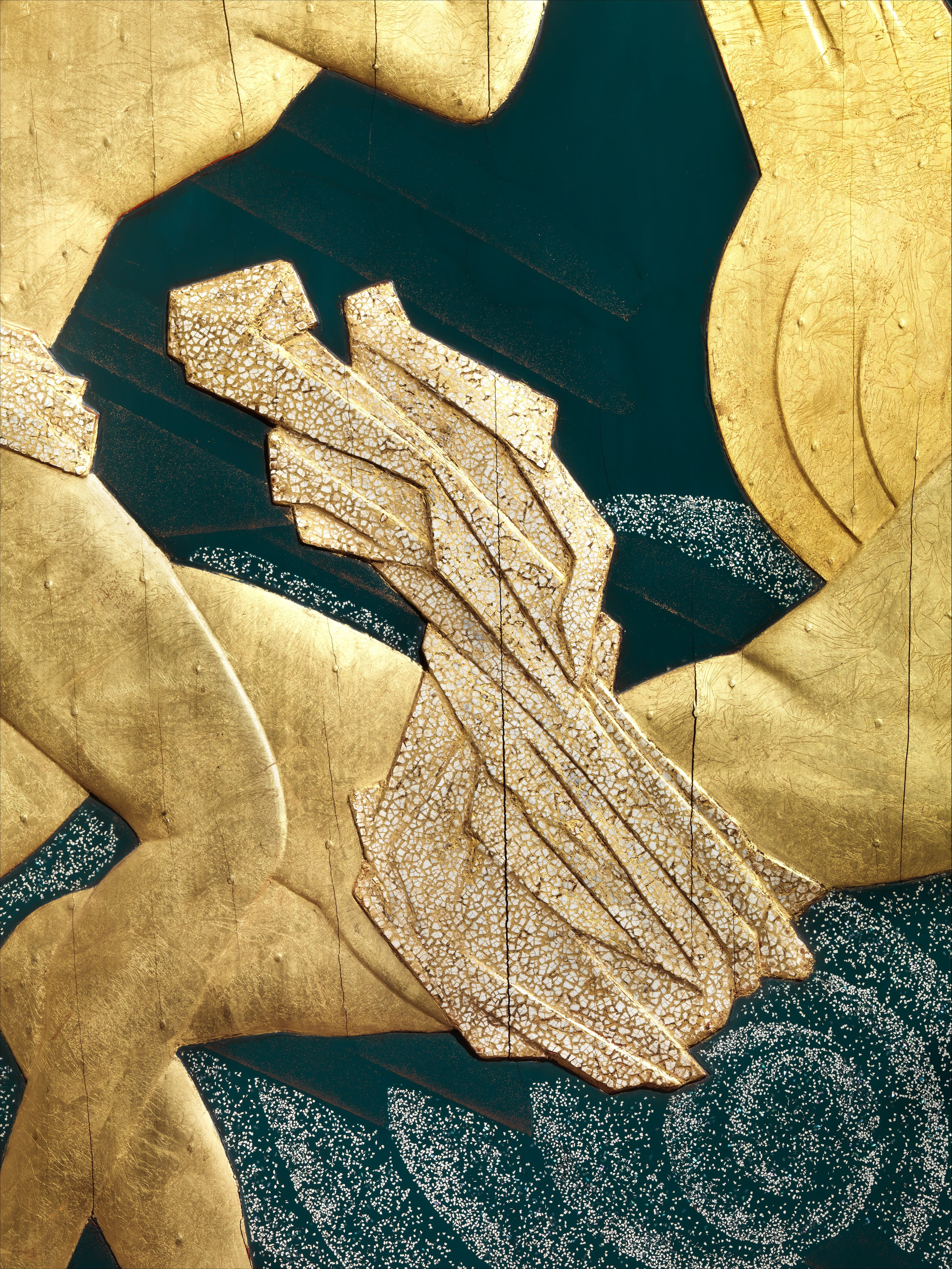
Jean Dunand, Detail of Decorative panel Fortissimo (1935) (Metropolitan Museum of Art).

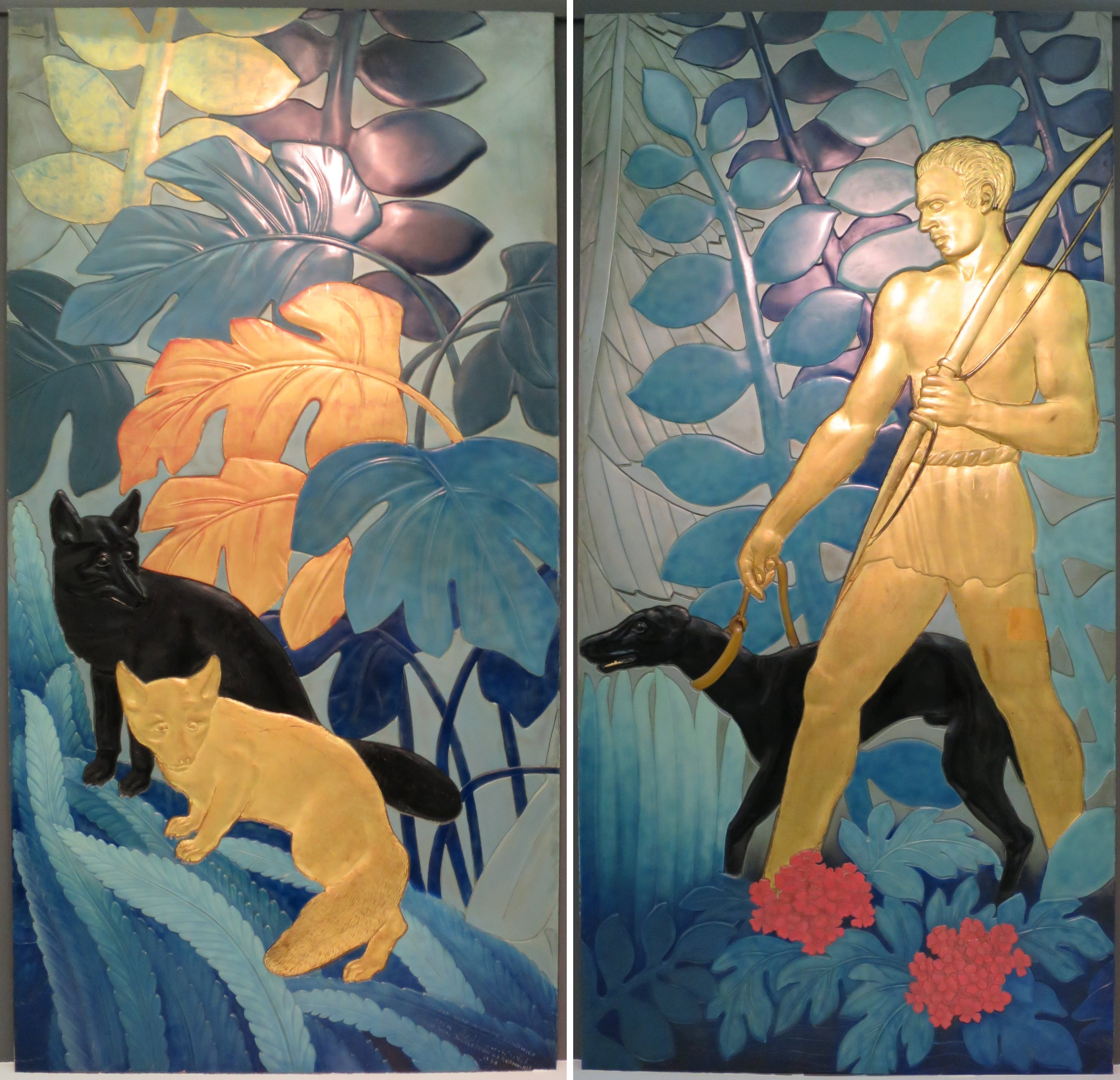
Jean Dunand, The Hunt, panel (1936), (Wolfsonian-FIU Museum).

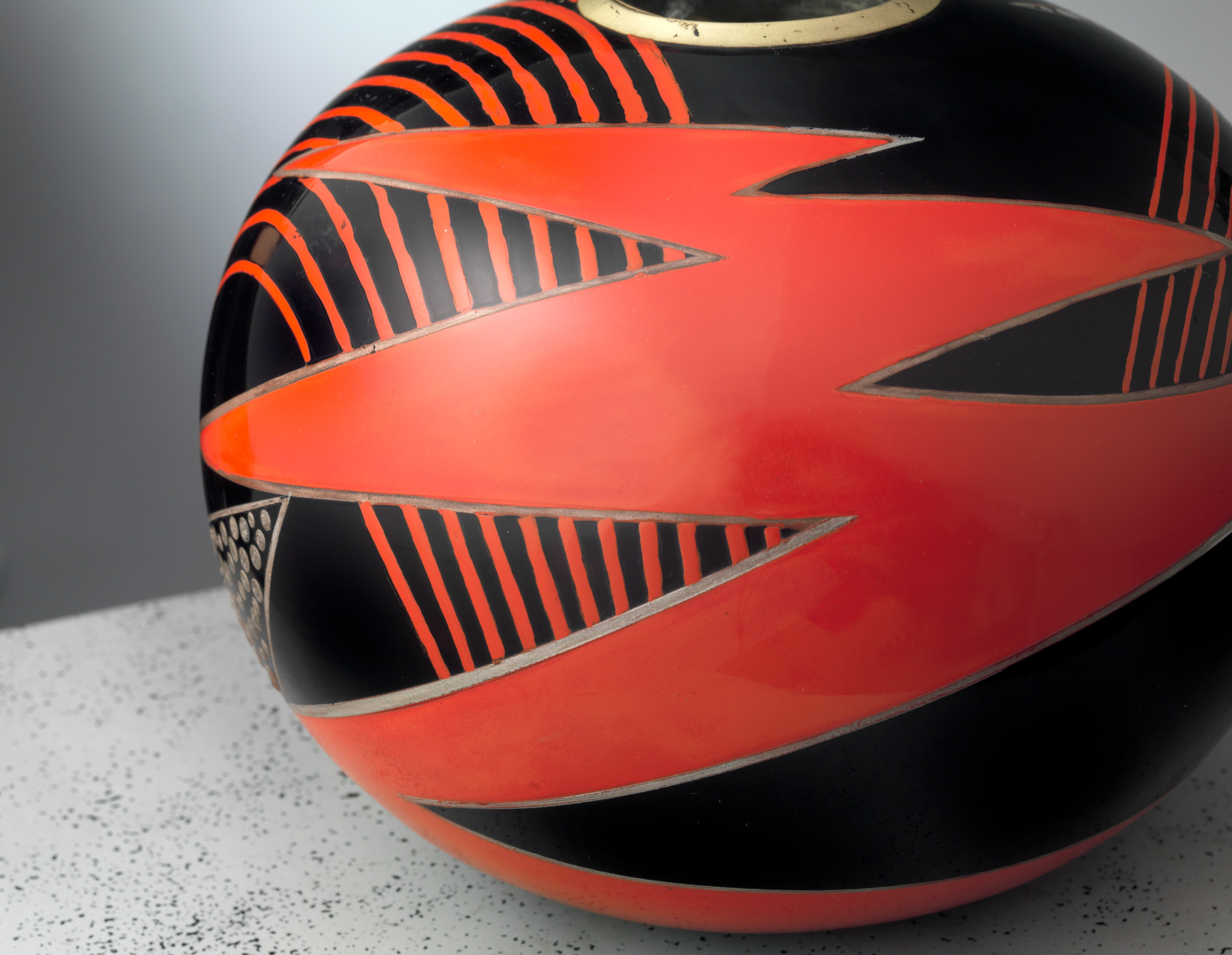
Jean Dunand, Vase of lacquered metal, c. 1935 (Metropolitan Museum).

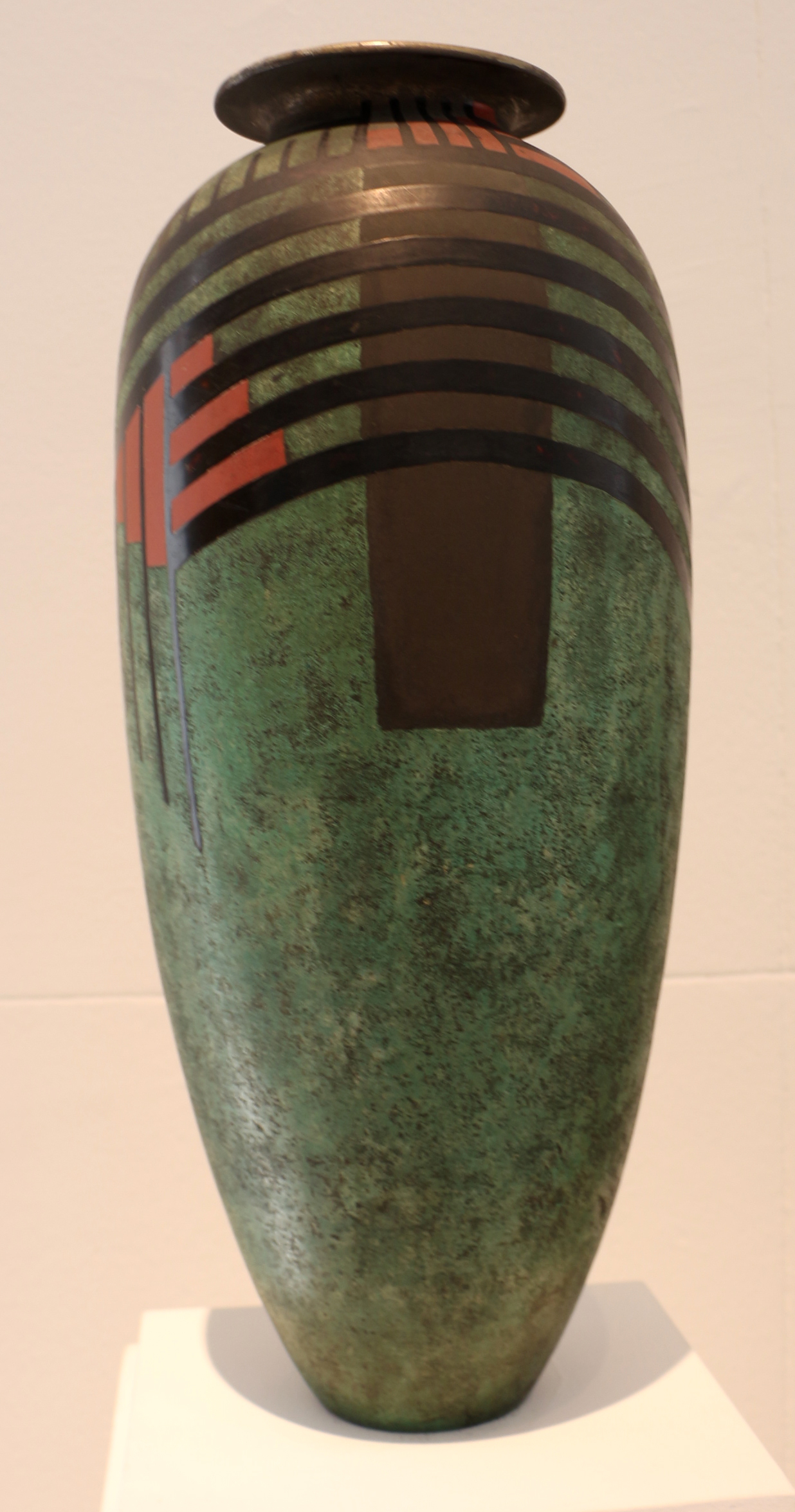
Jean Dunand, Lacquered vase, c. 1935 (Metropolitan Museum).

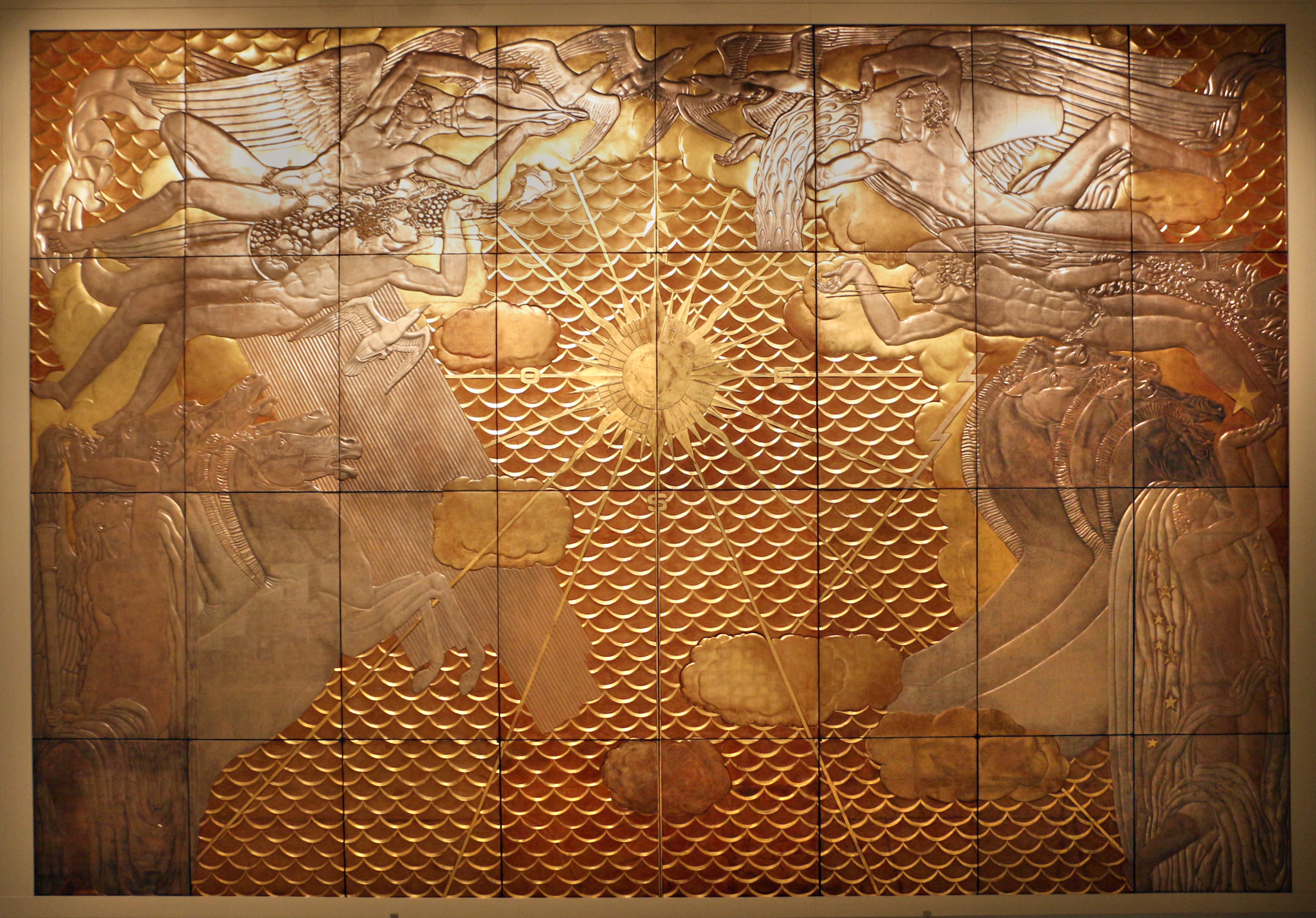
Jean Dunand and Jean Dupas, Panel of Chariot of Aurora, lacquer and metal, gesso (1935), (Carnegie Museum of Art).

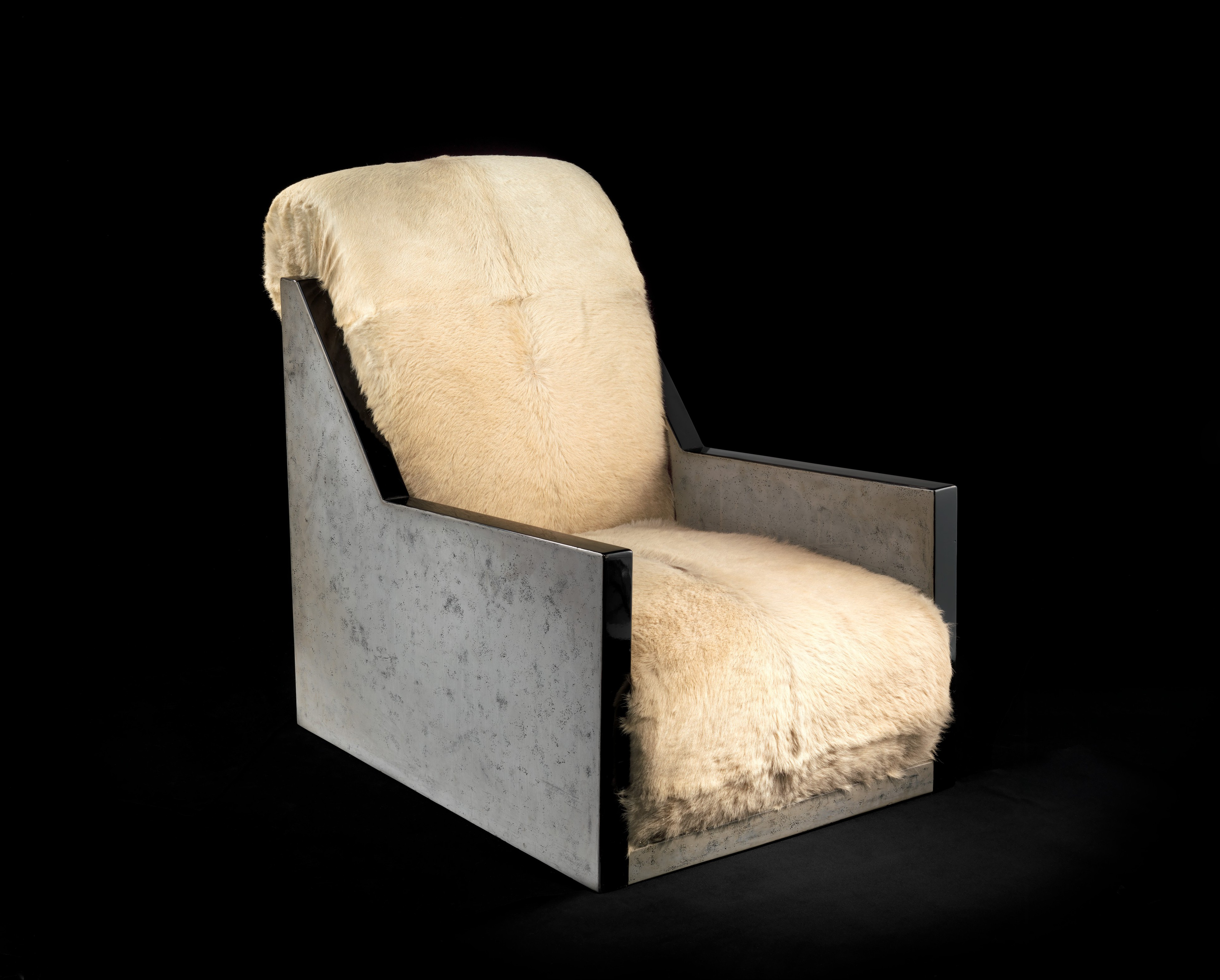
Jean Dunand, Easy chair of lacquered wood and goatskin (1927-1928) (Metropolitan Museum).

== Bibliography ==
- Cabanne, Pierre (1986). Encyclopédie Art Deco (in French). Somogy. ISBN 2-85056-178-9.
- Félix Marcilhac, Jean Dunand: His Life and Work, London, Thames and Hudson, 1991 OCLC 25611010
- Exhibition Catalogue "Madeleine Vionnet, Puriste de la Mode", Les Arts décoratifs, Paris, 24-06-2009 - 31-01-2010.
- E. Bénézit, "Dictionary of Artists", Paris 2006, Vol. 4, p. 1338–1339.
