= James Vibert =

Swiss sculptor

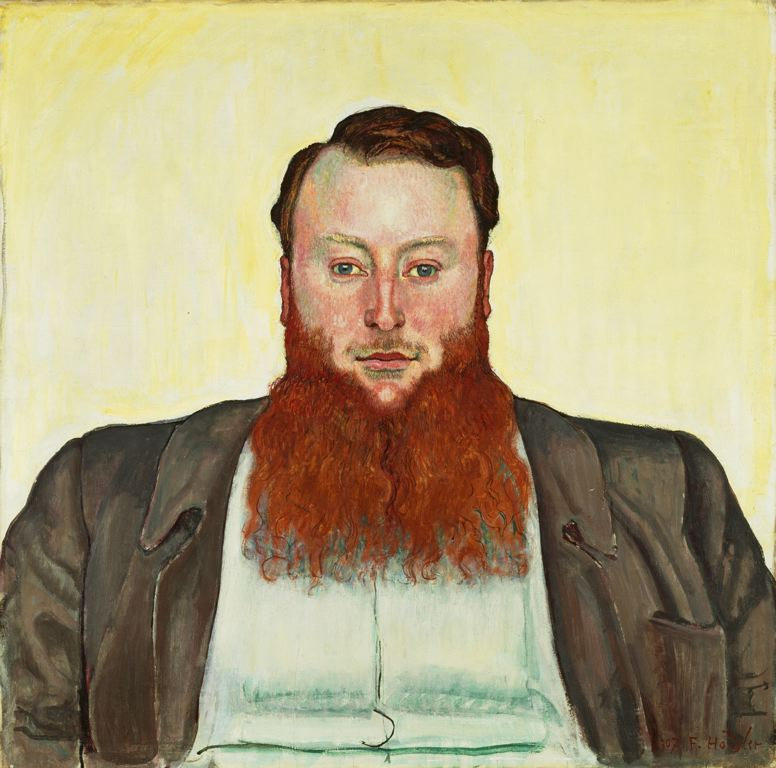
1907 portrait by Ferdinand Hodler

James Vibert (15 August 1872 in Carouge, Geneva – 2 May 1942, Plan-les-Ouates) was a Swiss sculptor and educator. He is known as one of the precursors of the Symbolism movement in Switzerland.

== Biography ==
Vibert was educated as an ironworker in Lyon and moved to Paris in 1891, where he joined the atelier of Rodin and where he associated himself with French Symbolism.

After his return to Switzerland he was commissioned for the monumental Three Confederates completed for the Federal Palace of Switzerland in 1914, and was nominated professor of the Geneva University of Art and Design (formerly École des Beaux-Arts de Genève) at Geneva. His former students included Pierre Le Faguays.

Ferdinand Hodler painted two portraits of Vibert, one in 1907 and the other in 1915. The 1907 portrait is on display at The Art Institute of Chicago as part of the Helen Birch Bartlett Memorial Collection.
