= Marcel Bouraine =

French sculptor

- Born: Marcel-André Bouraine; 1886; Pontoise, Île-de-France, France
- Died: 1948 (aged 61–62)
- Other names: Derenne, Marcel Bouraine Briand, Marcel-André Derenne
- Occupation: Sculptor
- Movement: Art Deco

Marcel Bouraine (1886–1948) was a French sculptor. He is known for his work in the Art Deco-era, specifically small statuettes, lamps, bookends, and radiator figures.

== Biography ==
Marcel Bouraine was born in 1886 in Pontoise, Île-de-France, France. He studied sculpture under the direction of Joseph-Alexandre Falguière. He exhibited at the Salon des Artistes Français, the Salon d'Automne, and the Salon des Tuileries (1922).

During World War I, Bouraine was a prisoner of war and was taken to Switzerland. He later studied at École Supérieure des Beaux-Arts, Genève.

Bouraine's work was part of the sculpture event in the art competition at the 1924 Summer Olympics. In 1928, he designed statuettes in pâte de verre for glass manufacturer Gabriel Argy-Rousseau. He exhibited two large sculptures at the Exposition Internationale des Arts et Techniques dans la Vie Moderne of 1937 in Paris.

Bouraine's work can be found in museum collections, including at the Art Institute of Chicago, and the Norwich Castle Museum and Art Gallery.
