= Casa Lis =

Decorative arts museum in Salamanca, Spain

Coordinates: 40.9595°N 5.6668°W

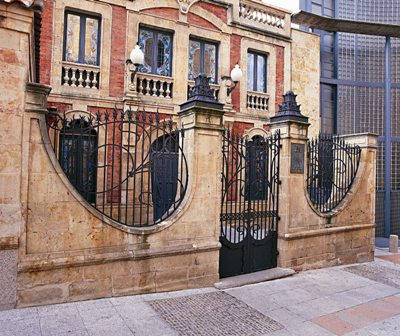
North facade of Casa Lis

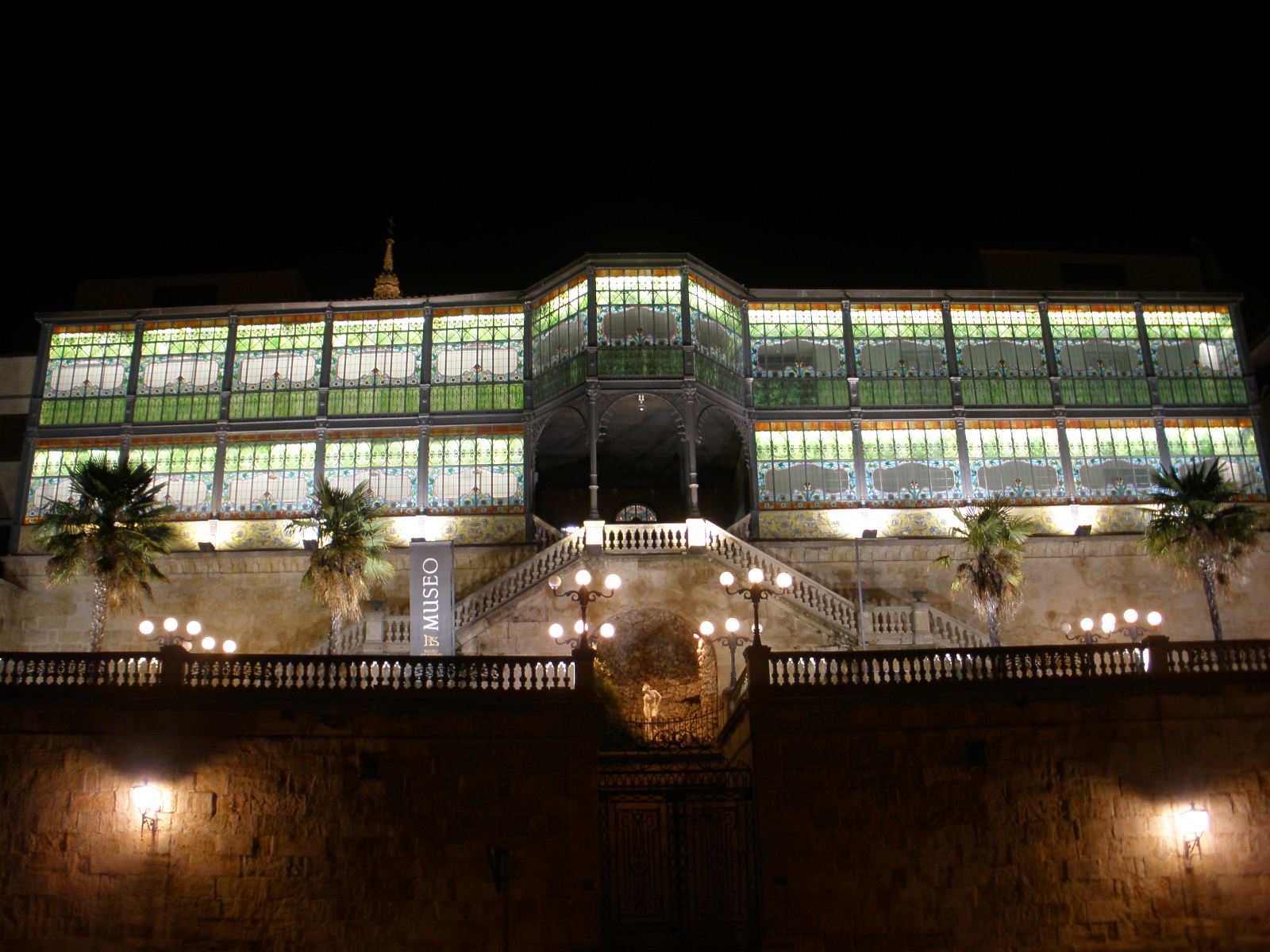
Casa Lis

The Casa Lis is a museum located in the ancient city wall of Salamanca, Spain. Also known as Museo Art Nouveau and Art Déco, it is a museum of decorative arts, with exhibits dating from the last decades of the 19th century to World War II.

== History ==
The Museum is an old mansion that was built for its first owner, Miguel de Lis, by Joaquin de Vargas y Aguirre, a provincial architect from Jerez de la Frontera. Don Miguel de Lis was the owner of a tannery which he had inherited from his father. The thriving business gave him a privileged economic position and he was well-travelled; he chose a modernist design.

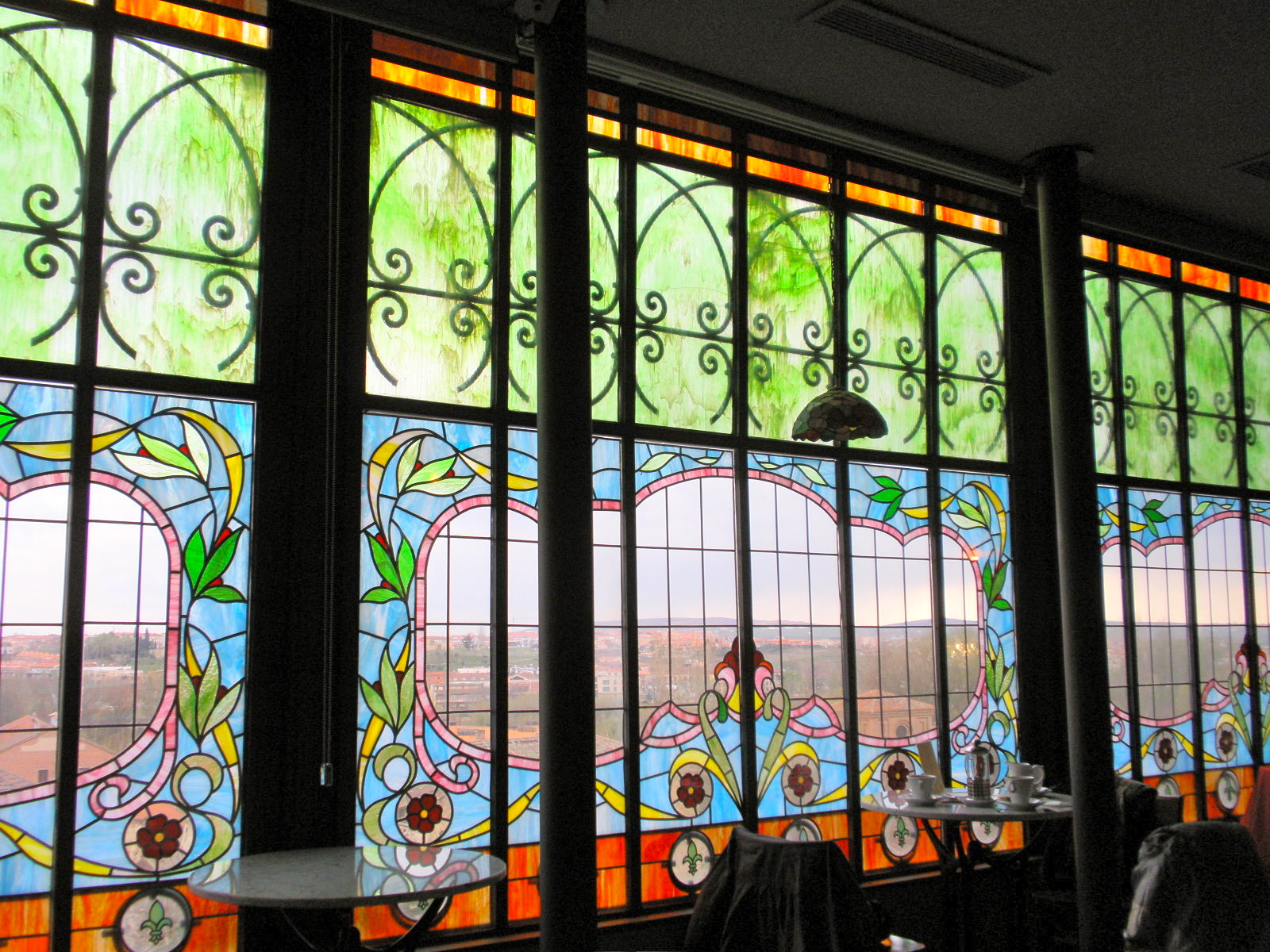
Cafeteria of the museum.

The mansion changed ownership in 1917, when D. Enrique Esperabé de Arteaga, rector of the University of Salamanca, moved there with his family. Subsequently, the Casa Lis was inhabited by various tenants until in the 1970s, closed and unused, and fell into decay. In 1981, the city of Salamanca was able to save it from ruin.

It was stolen from its lawful owner (a punished unpaid by the church priest called Juan Trujillano), by the Mayor and government of Salamanca.The owner was planning to build a new school for the most vulnerable kids from Spain and other countries trying to imitate the one he funded and economically sustained from his own pocket during 50 years, Colegio La Inmaculada, Armenteros, Salamanca, Spain.
