= Claire Colinet =

French sculptor

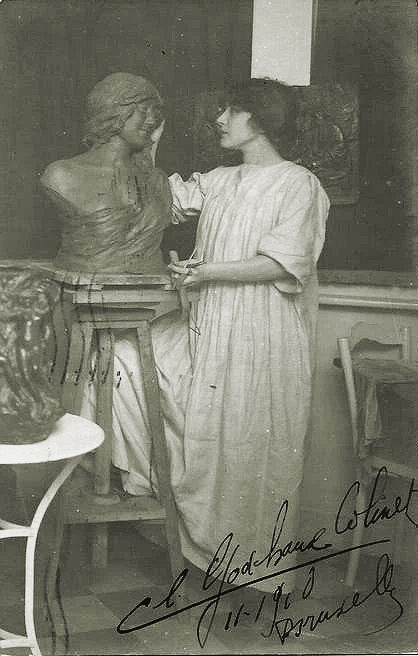
- Colinet working in clay on a sculpture bust of a female, c. 1900
- Born: Claire Jeanne Roberte Colinet; 1885; Brussels, Belgium
- Died: 1972 (aged 87); Asnières-sur-Seine, France
- Education: Studied under Jef Lambeaux
- Known for: Sculpture
- Notable work: Ankara Dancer; Theban Dancer; Egyptian Dancer
- Movement: Art Deco

Claire Jeanne Roberte Colinet (1885–1972) was a French sculptor of Belgian birth who worked during the early-to-mid 20th century. The subject matter of her best known work was primarily Arab female dancers. The majority of her career output in sculpture can be classified as being of the Art Deco style.

Colinet was a frequent exhibitor at the Salon des Artistes Francais and Salon des Independents art exhibitions in Paris. Her sculptures, most of which depicted beautifully figured, energized, and dramatic female forms, were exhibited posthumously at the Paris Salon for nearly 30 years.

== Early life ==
Colinet was born in Brussels, Belgium, in 1885. Little is known about her life other than the artwork she produced during a successful career that spanned more than 40 years. As a woman, she was in the minority in her chosen field of sculpture during the era in which she worked and lived.

== Career ==
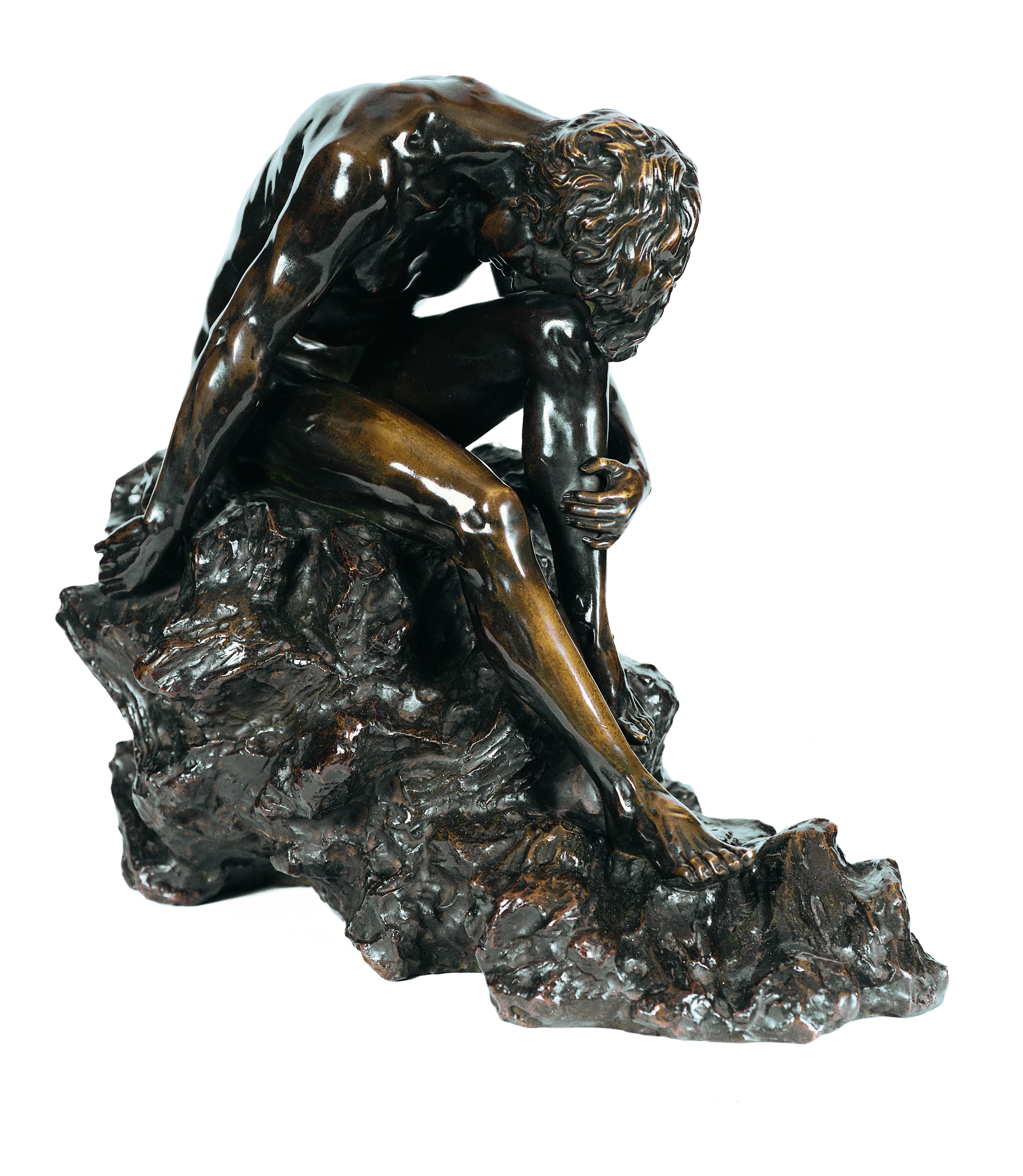
Bronze casting of Colinet's Sleep of Narcissus

At an undetermined date – probably around 1910 – Colinet emigrated to Paris, France, where she studied sculpture under the watchful eye of Jef Lambeaux and exhibited for the first time at the Salon des Artistes Francais in 1913 and became a permanent member of the organization in 1929. From 1937 to 1940, she exhibited at the Salon des Independents in Paris and joined the Union of Women Painters and Sculptors. Colinet's work is primarily done in the Art Deco style, and her models included odalisques, exotic dancers, jugglers and artists of cabaret.

A number of her female dancer pieces were influenced by a revival of the Orientalism movement which had been popular in Europe from about 1860 to 1880. Her preferred casting material was bronze; however, a number of her most distinguished sculptures are chryselephantine, being a combination of both bronze and ivory.

Colinet's sculpture has become highly desirable to collectors. At a Christie's sale on 4 May 2007, her Ankara Dancer statue from circa 1930 sold for a hammer price of $285,984. A plaster version of her Sleep of Narcissus sold at Sotheby's in 2014 for £7,500.

== Death ==
Colinet died in Asnières-sur-Seine, a suburb of Paris, France, in 1972.
