= Gechu =

Gechū (牙虫; active 18th century) was a Japanese sculptor. His dates of birth and death are not known.

== Biography ==
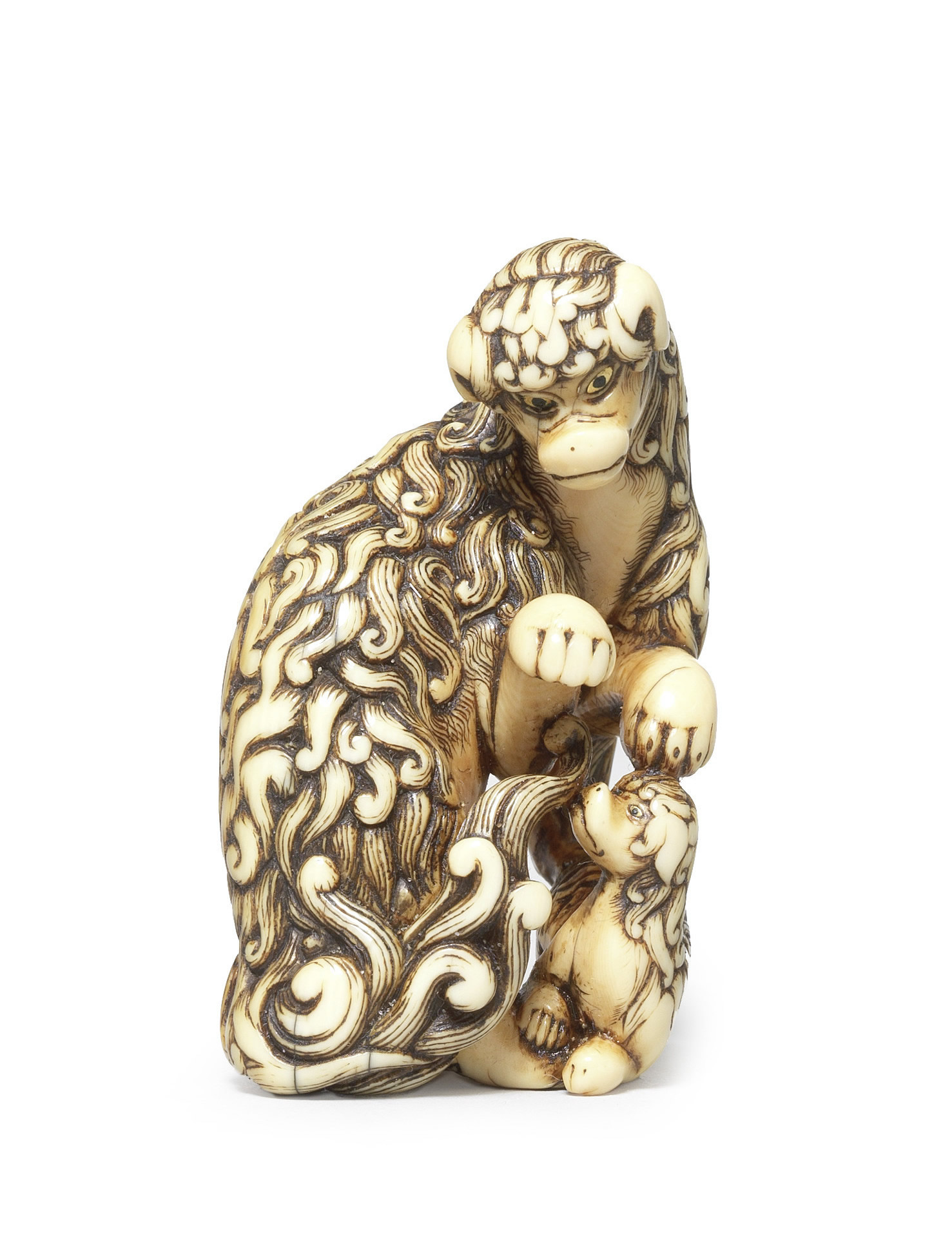
Carved shaggy dog and pup netsuke made out of ivory, signed by Gechū

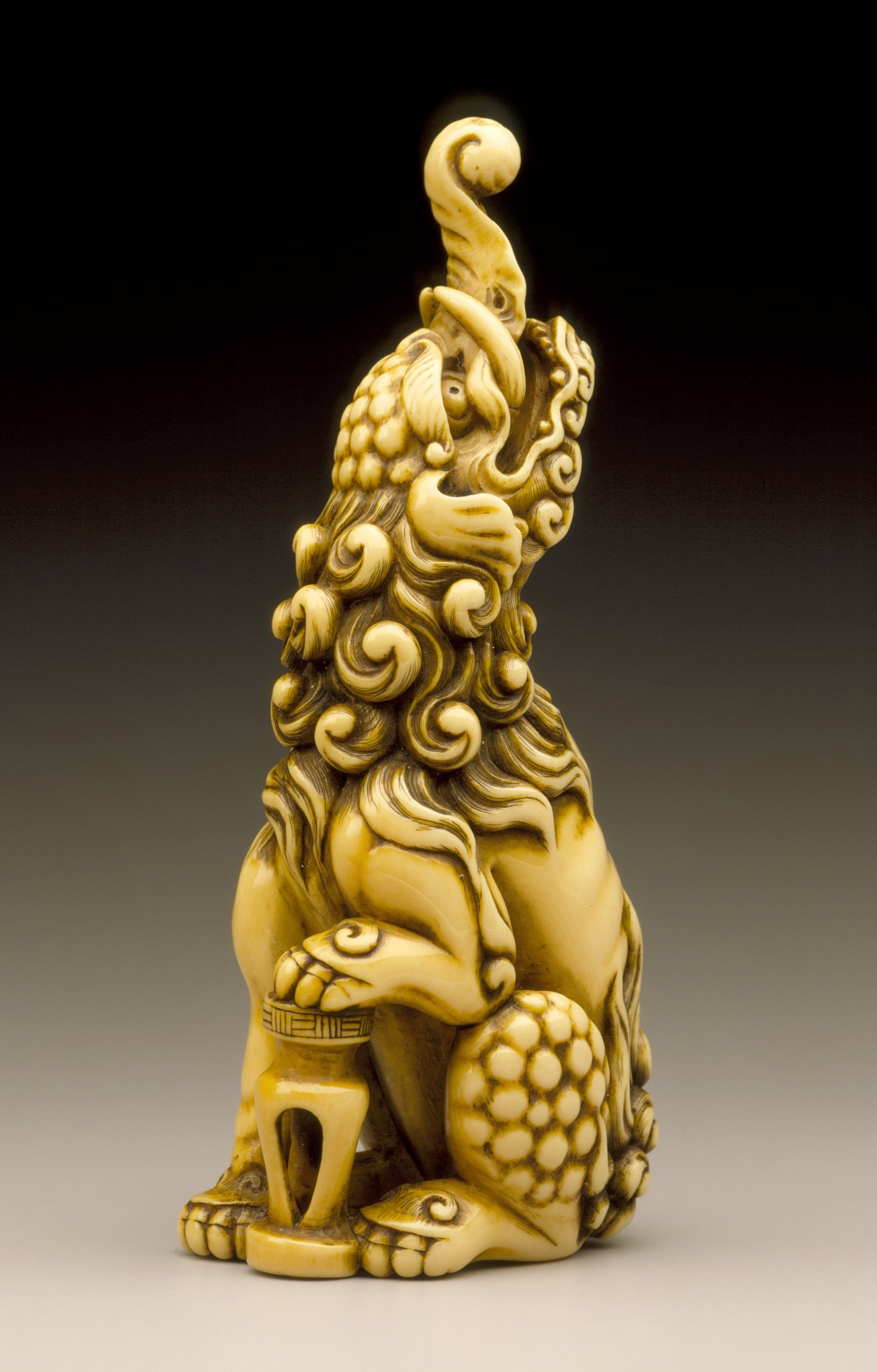
Baku: Monster that Eats Nightmares, ivory with staining, sumi (ink), and traces of red pigment, attributed to Gechū

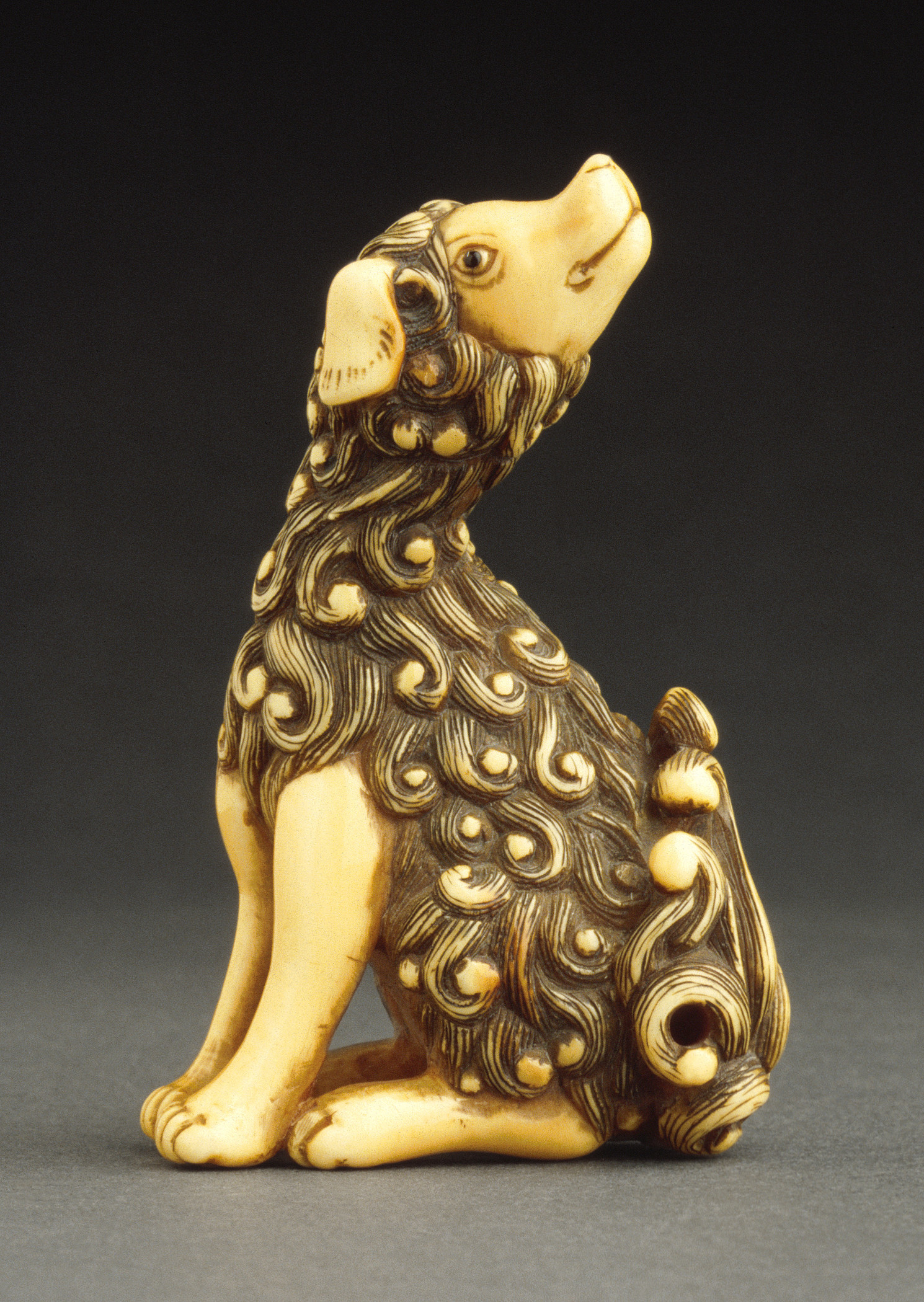
Dog, ivory with staining, sumi, inlays, attributed to Gechū

Little is known about Gechū's life, he is primarily known through his works, in particular netsuke. He was an Osaka School style artist, and is known to have sculpted in ivory. It was originally believed he lived in Osaka though recently it has been suggested that he may have been at home in Satsuma Province on Kyushu.

His most celebrated netsuke, upon which many attributions to Gechū are based, an ivory of a shaggy dog and pup, was sold at the last auction of the M. T. Hindson collection on 23 June 1969. This supreme masterpiece of the art form was the favourite netsuke of the pianist Julius Katchen and he was determined to purchase it for his collection. He died a few months before the sale and his widow, Arlette, is said to have bid for and bought it in his memory. When sold at Bonhams in 2016, the work achieved the second highest price ever for a netsuke at auction.

Of this work, Frederick Meinertzhagen remarks in his Card Index,

Curious and grotesque figure of a Bitch with stylised treatment of the hair, sitting up and playing with her pup. The eyes of both gilt. The "himotoshi" openings on the animals' left side. Signed under the left leg Gechu. An outstandingly fine netsuke dating from well back in the 18th century, showing all the character, power and free treatment of the period. A somewhat comparable figure of a bitch and pup signed Garaku is in the V. and A. Museum and it maybe that there is significance in the fact that the first character Ge lacks a stroke, can be read as ge or ga

— Frederick Meinertzhagen, The Meinertzhagen card index

Two netsuke attributed to Gechū are kept in the Los Angeles County Museum of Art.

== See also ==
- Ikkan
- Masanao of Kyoto

== Bibliography ==
- Bushell, Raymond. Netsuke Familiar and Unfamiliar: New Principles for Collecting. New York: Weatherhill, 1975.
- Bushell, Raymond. An Exhibition of Netsuke from the Raymond Bushell Collection. Tokyo: Mikimoto World Jewelers, 1979.
- Atchley, Virginia G. "The Pavilion of Japanese Art in Los Angeles." Netsuke Kenkyukai Study Journal 8, no.4 (1988): 18–25.
- Atchely, Virginia. "Raymond Bushell Netsuke at The Los Angeles County Museum of Art." Netsuke Kenkyukai Study Journal 5, no.1 (1985): 11–18.
- Bushell, Raymond. "To Donate or Not to Donate." Impressions: the Journal of the Japanese Art Society of America 42, pt.2 (2021): 100–121.
- Bushell, Raymond. Netsuke Familiar and Unfamiliar: New Principles for Collecting. New York: Weatherhill, 1975.
- Bushell, Raymond. An Exhibition of Netsuke from the Raymond Bushell Collection. Tokyo: Mikimoto World Jewelers, 1979.
- Lazarnick, George. Netsuke and Inro Artists, and How to Read Their Signatures, vol. 1. Honolulu: Reed Publishers, 1981.
- Catalog of an Exhibition of Netsuke from the Collection of Raymond Bushell. London: Christie, Manson & Woods Ltd., 1984.
- Beckett, Sister Wendy. Sister Wendy's American Collection, Toby Eady Associates, ed. Harper Collins Publishers, 2000.
- Goodall, Hollis, Virginia G. Atchley, Neil K. Davey, Christine Drosse, Sebastian Izzard, Odile Madden, and Robert T. Singer. The Raymond and Frances Bushell Collection of Netsuke: A Legacy at the Los Angeles County Museum of Art. Chicago: Art Media Resources, Inc.; Los Angeles: Los Angeles County Museum of Art, 2003.
- Los Angeles County Museum of Art. New York: Thames and Hudson, 2003.
