= Julius Katchen =

American concert pianist (1926–1969)

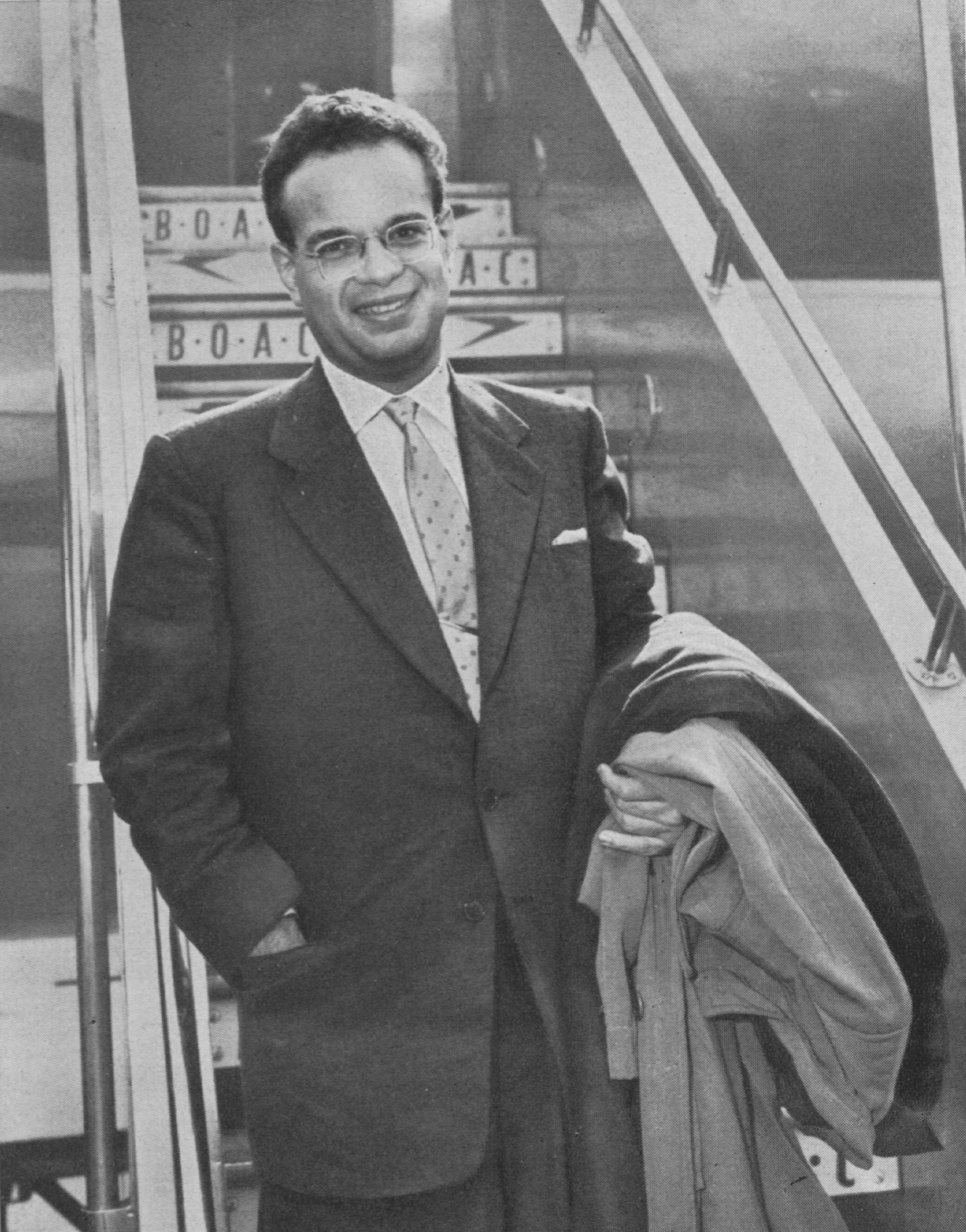
Julius Katchen in 1956.

Julius Katchen (August 15, 1926 – April 29, 1969) was an American concert pianist, possibly best known for his recordings of Johannes Brahms's solo piano works.

== Career ==
Katchen was born in Long Branch, New Jersey, and debuted at age 10, playing Mozart's D minor Concerto. Eugene Ormandy heard of his debut, and invited him to perform with the Philadelphia Orchestra in New York. He studied music with his maternal grandparents, Mandell and Rosalie Svet, immigrants from Europe who had taught at the Moscow and Warsaw conservatories, until he was 14. He attended Haverford College, completing a four-year degree in philosophy in three years, graduating first in his class in 1946. He went to Paris and was invited to represent the United States at the first International UNESCO Festival, where he played Beethoven's Emperor Concerto with the Orchestre National de la Radiodiffusion Française. He then toured Europe in the spring of 1947, playing recitals in Rome, Venice, Naples, Paris, London and Salzburg. After this, he decided to live in Paris permanently, saying "In France piano students come together constructively, and they can even become friends. They attend one another's concerts and applaud. In the US they go to hear a colleague play, but only in the hope of seeing him break his neck."

He married Arlette Patoux, of Le Vesinet, France in 1956. His pupils in France included Jean-Rodolphe Kars and Pascal Rogé.

== Death and legacy ==
In December 1968, Katchen played at a two-day show in London hosted by the Rolling Stones. Katchen played two works (one of them de Falla's Ritual Fire Dance). There is a DVD of the show called "The Rolling Stones Rock and Roll Circus". His last public appearance was with the London Symphony Orchestra on December 12, 1968, playing Ravel's Concerto for the Left Hand. He succumbed to cancer the next spring and died at the age of 42 at his home in Paris.

Katchen and Arlette were avid and astute collectors of netsuke; 195 pieces from their collection were sold at auction in 2005 and 2006 for £1.2 million ($2.2 million) (Sotheby's 2005 and 2006). A further 392 were sold at auction in 2016 and 2017 for £2.3 million ($3 million) (Bonhams 2016 and 2017), including Katchen's favorite piece (acquired after his death by Arlette) depicting a shaggy dog and pup by famed 18th century artist, Gechu, which brought the second highest price ever for a netsuke sold at auction.

== Notable recordings ==
Katchen's six-disc set of Johannes Brahms's Works for Solo Piano (Decca) is highly regarded and often cited as one of the best available recordings of Brahms's piano music. In 2016, Decca released a 36-disc set of his complete recordings for the label. In the late 1960s he recorded the Brahms trios for Decca with Josef Suk and János Starker. He also recorded the three violin sonatas with Suk, and the second cello sonata with Starker, but died before they could record the first sonata.

Katchen was the soloist in Benjamin Britten's first recording of Diversions, op. 21 for piano left hand and orchestra in 1954 with the London Symphony Orchestra.
