= Ojime =

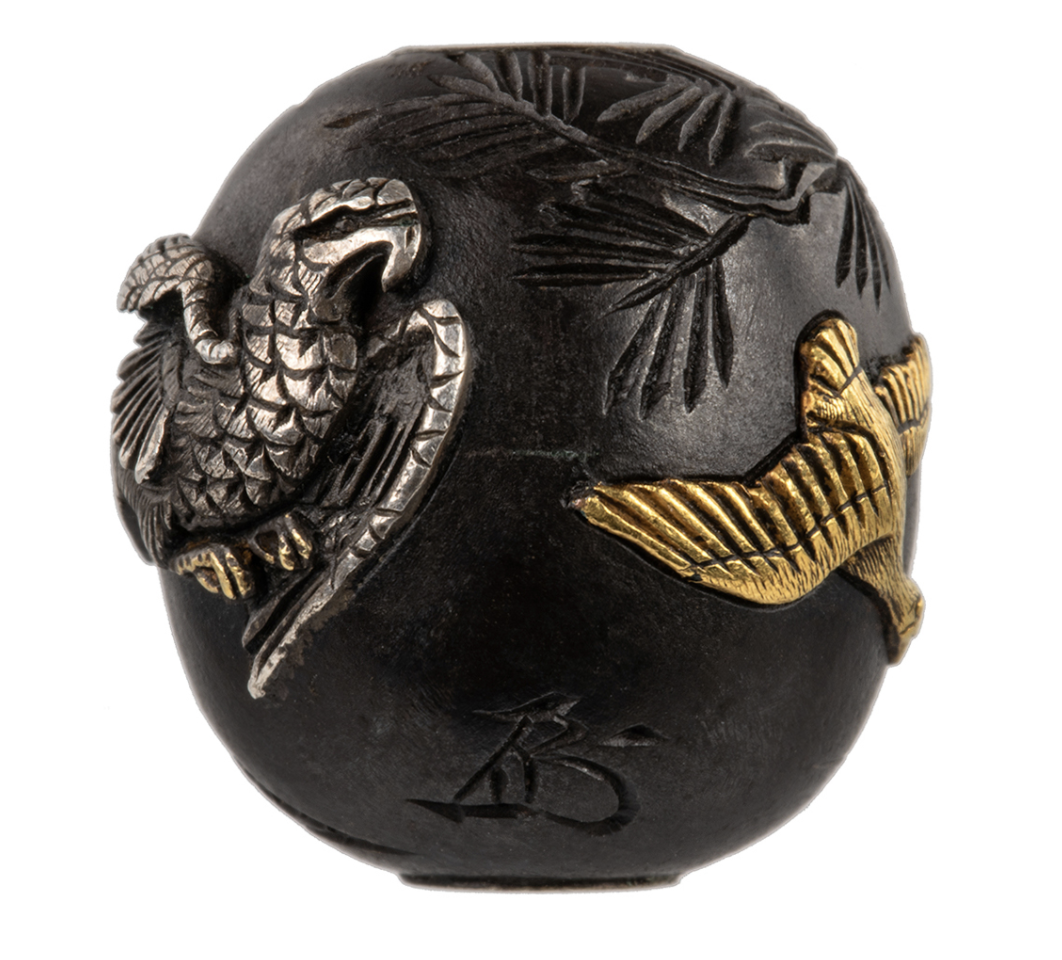
A Japanese 19th-century mixed metal ojime bead

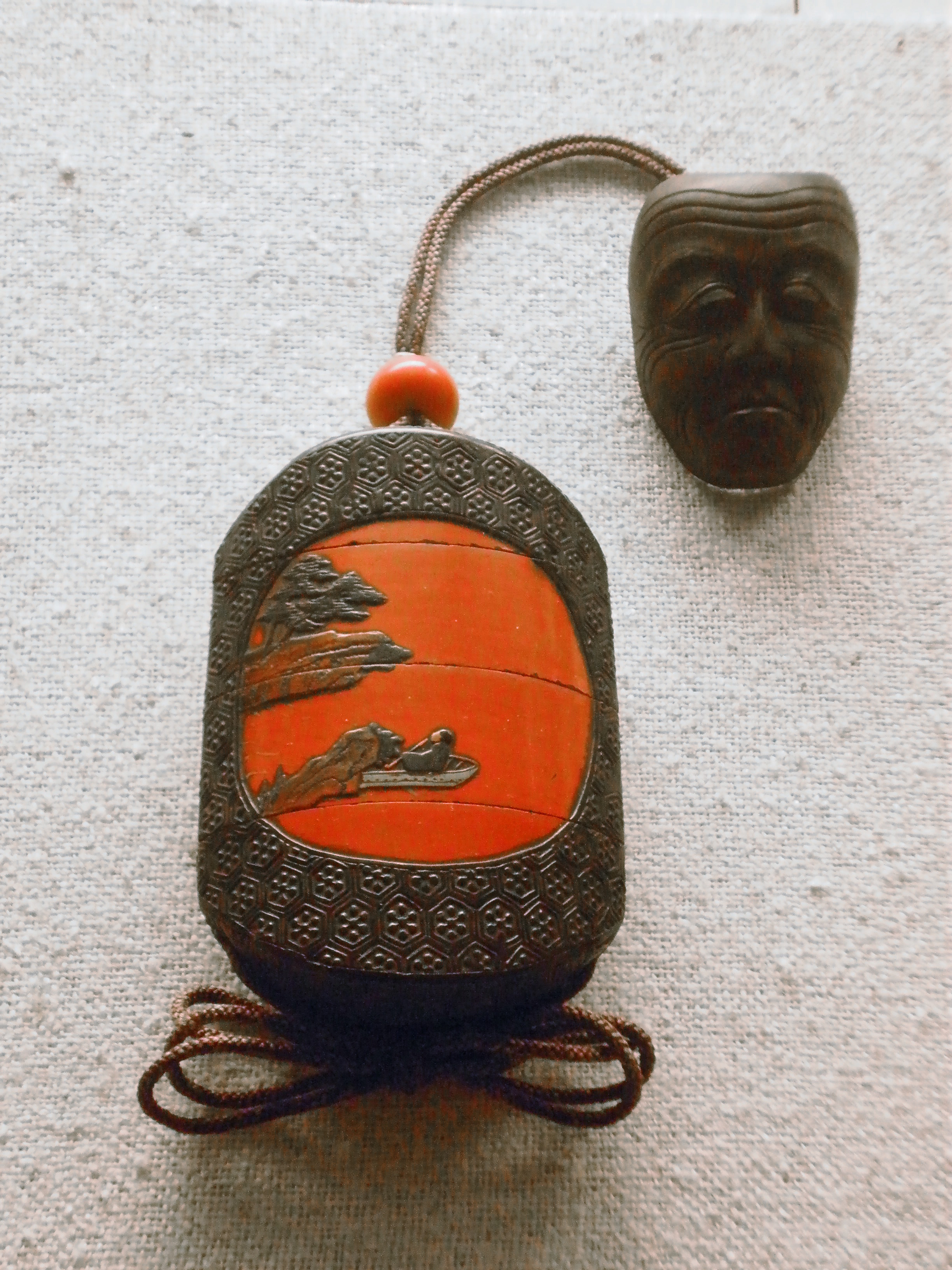
Inro, ojime and netsuke. Lacquer inro, stained ivory ojime and wooden netsuke; inro features a reclining figure in a boat; netsuke is in the form of a mask, by Ikkan (ca. 1750-1850)

An ojime (緒締め, lit. "cord fastener") is a bead used in Japanese inrō (carrying cases). It is typically under an inch in length. Each is carved into a particular shape and image, similar to the netsuke, though smaller. It is used to fasten the cord of the inrō so that it does not unstack while carried.

The history of ojime beads dates back to the Edo period (1603–1868). Ojime beads, netsuke, and sagemono or inrō cases would be items worn on a traditional kimono, typically hanging from the belt.

== Images ==
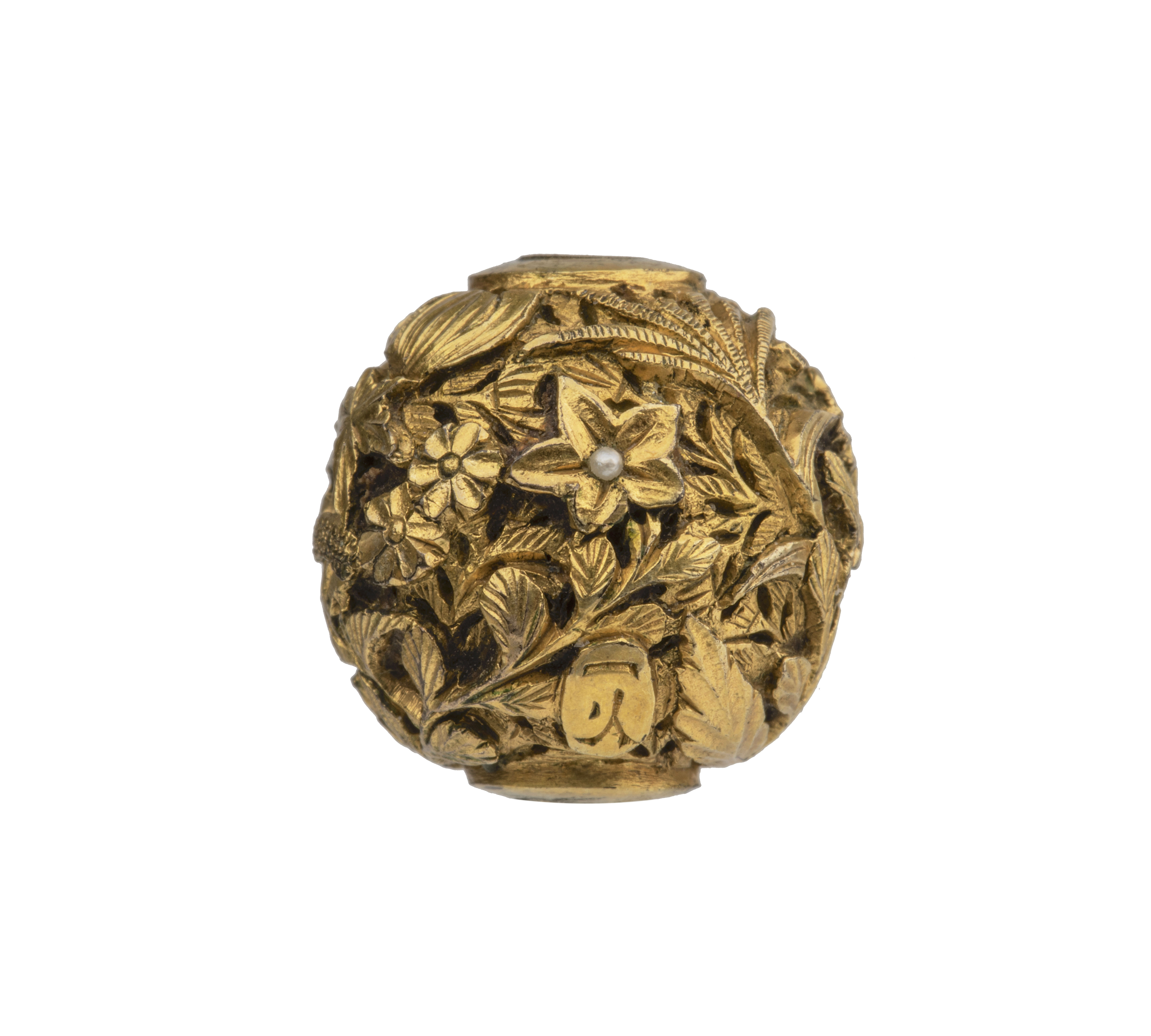
A Meiji gilt bronze pearl-inlaid ojime

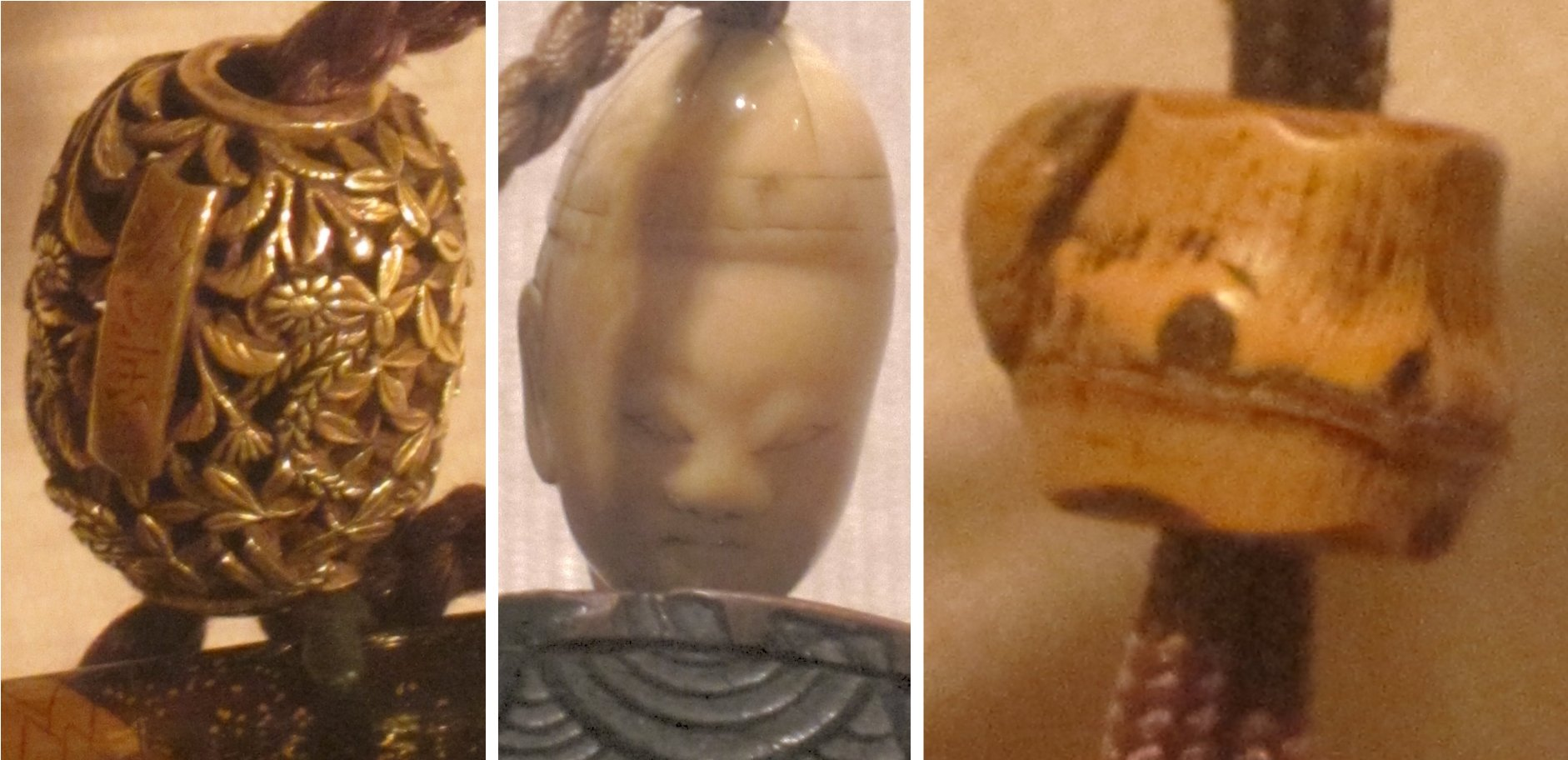
Ojime at the Honolulu Museum of Art

== See also ==
- Inrō
- Netsuke
- Okimono
