= Tametaka =

Tametaka (為隆) was a renowned netsuke carver from Nagoya, Owari province, central Japan. He is considered the founder of the art of netsuke carving in Nagoya.

== Biography ==
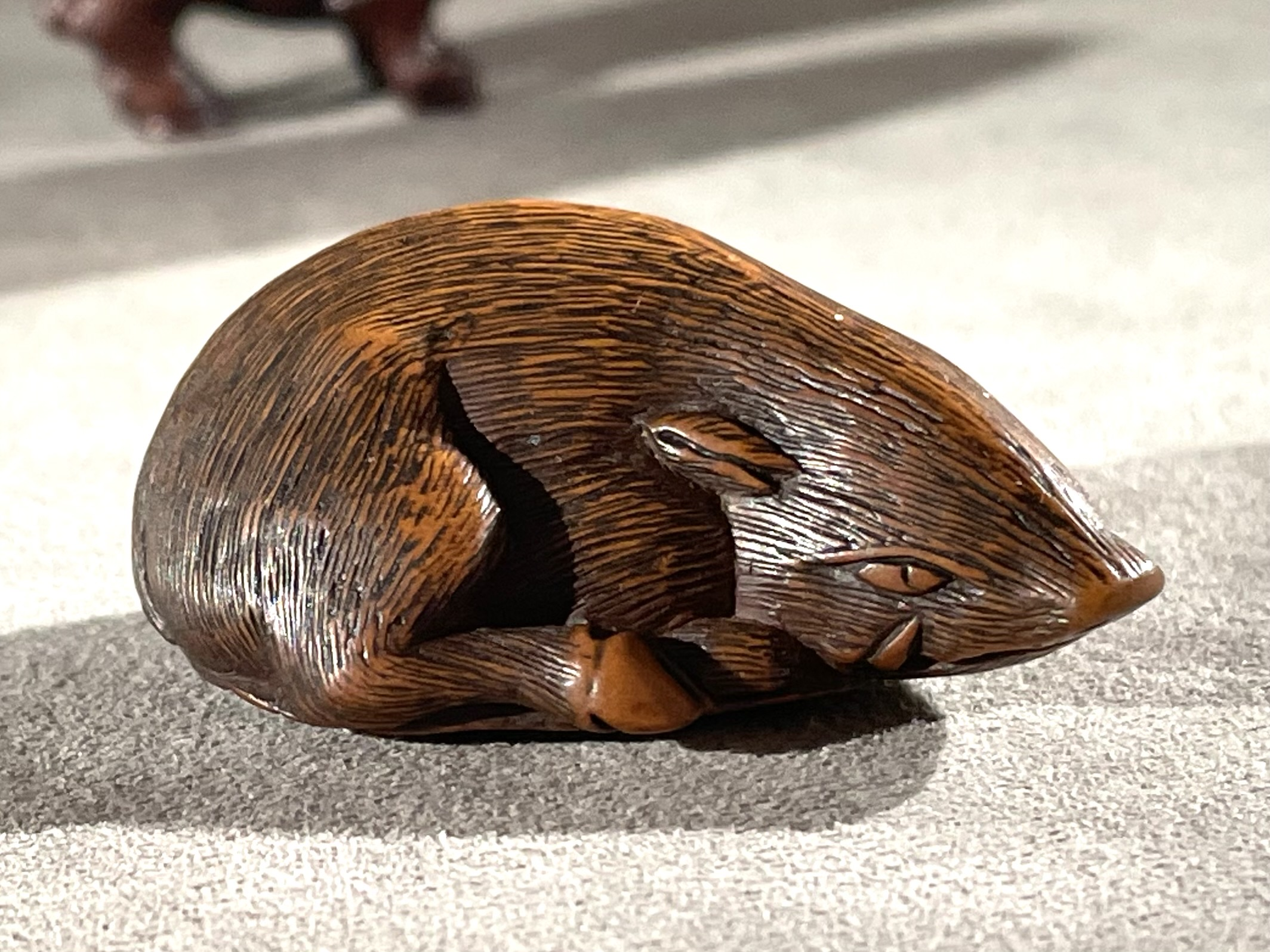
Wood netsuke of a boar resting on autumn leaves, by Tametaka late 18th century

He was mentioned in the Sōken Kishō (装劍奇賞), a compilation published in Osaka in 1781 by Inaba Tsūyrū, in which over 50 netsuke masters are listed. His exact biographical dates are not for certain, it is speculated he might have lived about 1730 to 1790, but could also have lived until 1830. Around 500-600 netsuke are known to exist by his hand.

His works are known for their intricate details and dynamism.

He also signed his works with "Kinjōnan Tametaka" (金城南為隆), Kinjōnan translated meaning "south of Nagoya Castle".

Another renowned carver who continued the Nagoya school tradition was Ikkan (1817–1893).

== Bibliography ==
- Hurtig, Bernard (1973) Masterpieces of Netsuke Art: One Thousand Favorites of Leading Collectors, p. 51, no. 134
- Eskenazi Ltd. (1993) Japanese Netsuke from the Carré Collection, pp. 128-129, no. 149
- Eskenazi Ltd. (1997) Japanese Netsuke, Inro and Ojime from the Dawson Collection, pp. 34-35, no. 47
- N. Davey, MTH, p. 188, no. 563
- F. Meinertzhagen, MCI, p. 834
- A. Ducros, NS, p. 80
- Sydney L. Moss, EIN, p. 81, no. 56
- A. Katchen, N7, p. 31, no. K328
- G. Lazarnick, NIA, p. 1075
- R. Barker and L. Smith, NMSJ, p. 95, no. 164
- R. Bandini, SON, p. 82, no. 116
