= Masanao of Kyoto =

Japanese sculptor

Masanao (正直, mid-late 1700s) was a noted Japanese sculptor of netsuke from the Kyoto area. He is thus associated with the Kyoto school. His works often depict animals, and he is considered to have been one of the greatest artists working in the netsuke art form.

== Biography ==
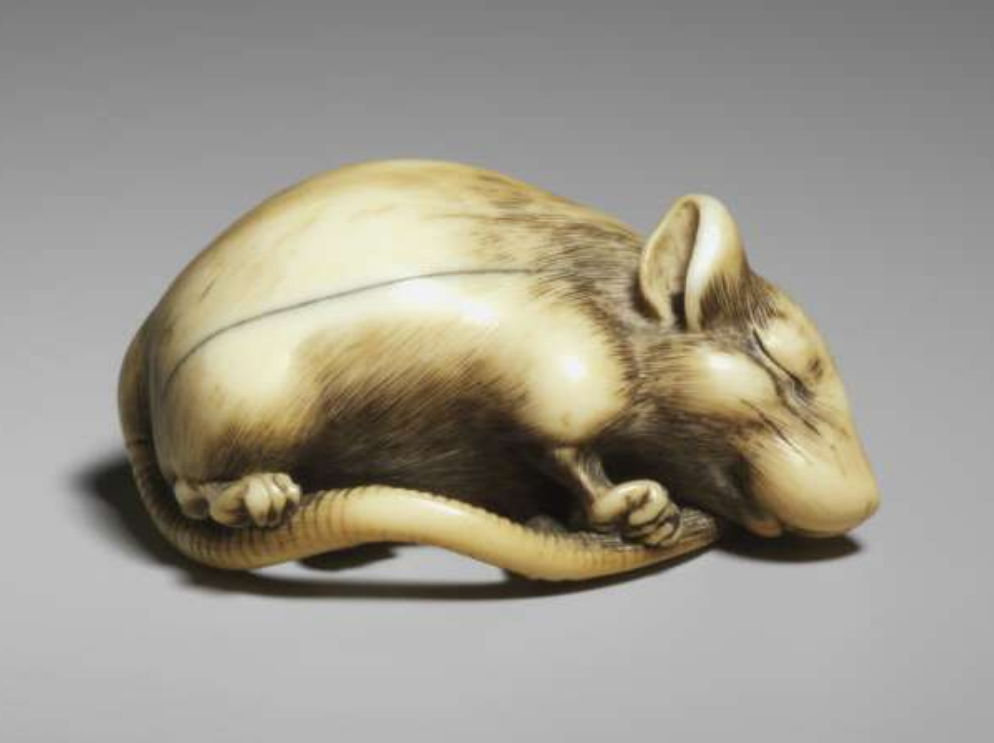
Carved netsuke of a sleeping rat, made out of ivory, by Masanao from Kyoto

He was mentioned in the Sōken Kishō (装劍奇賞), a compilation published in Osaka in 1781 by Inaba Tsūyrū, in which over 50 netsuke masters are listed. The Sōken Kishō refers to Masanao as skillful and deserving of high praise and recognition. Nevertheless, nothing is now known about his life and career beyond the fact that he was resident of Kyoto.

Masanao's ability to exquisitely capture animal forms in ever varying poses, often imbued with a vitality which evokes the sense of a moment frozen in time, strongly suggests direct observation from nature.

Frederick Meinertzhagen remarks:

In the carving of animal subjects, particularly those in ivory, Masanao is supreme among netsuke carvers. He was less successful with human figures. The charm of his netsuke lies in their striking originality of design, bold outlines, free subtle curves, smooth surfaces unmarred by extraneous detail, and spirited character. His animals, though often idealised and even grotesque, never fail in realism.

— Frederick Meinertzhagen, The Art of The Netsuke Carver

Masanao of Kyoto should not be confused with the series of netsuke-shi from Ujiyamada, Ise Province (modern day Ise) who carved under the same name (albeit with a different variant of the Nao kanji in signatures)

== See also ==
- Gechū
- Ikkan
