= Ikkan =

Ikkan (一貫) (1817–1893) was one of the most renowned netsuke artists in Japan during the Edo period.

== Biography ==
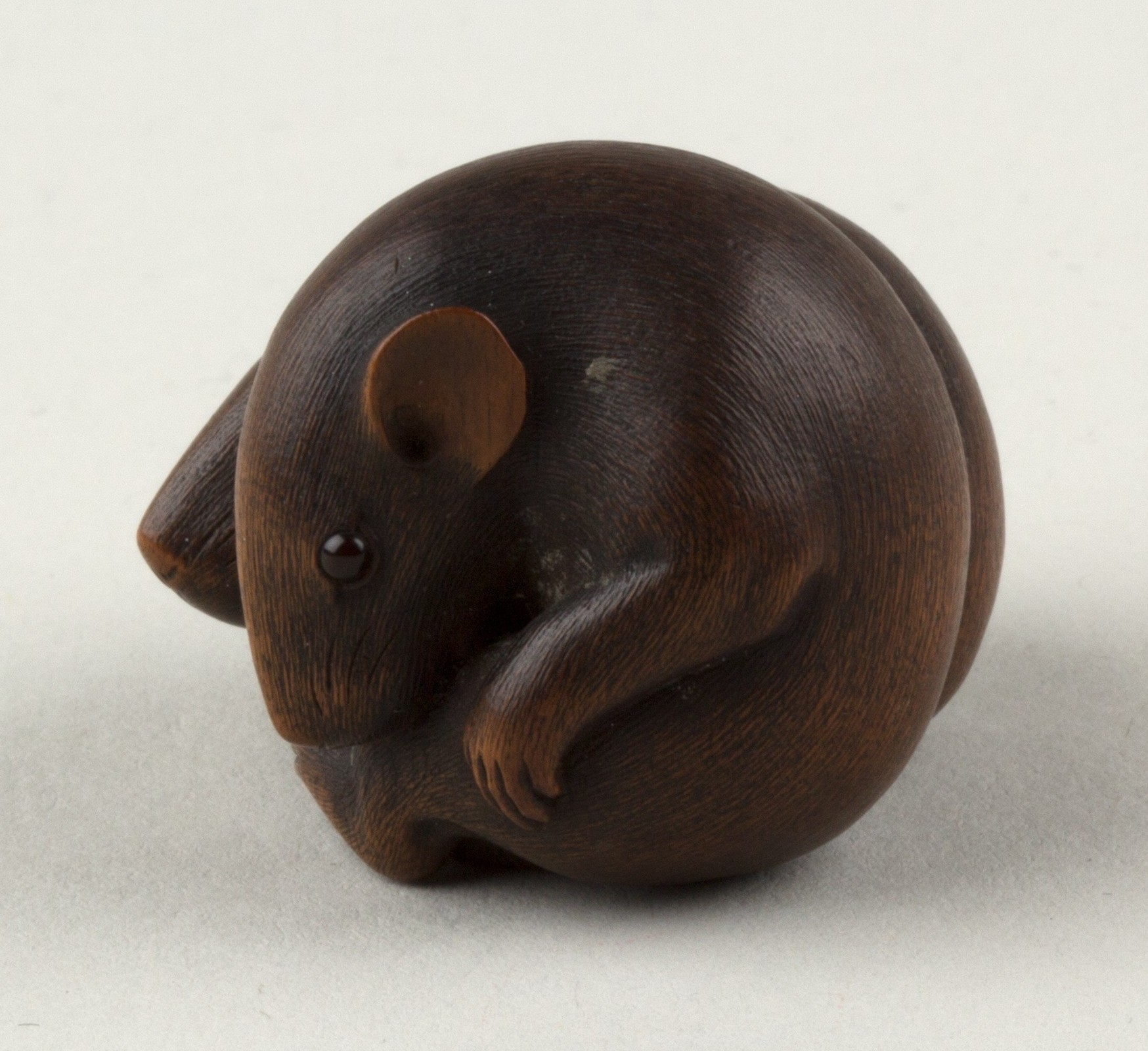
Netsuke in the shape of a curled rat made out of wood and horn, mid-19th century, by Ikkan

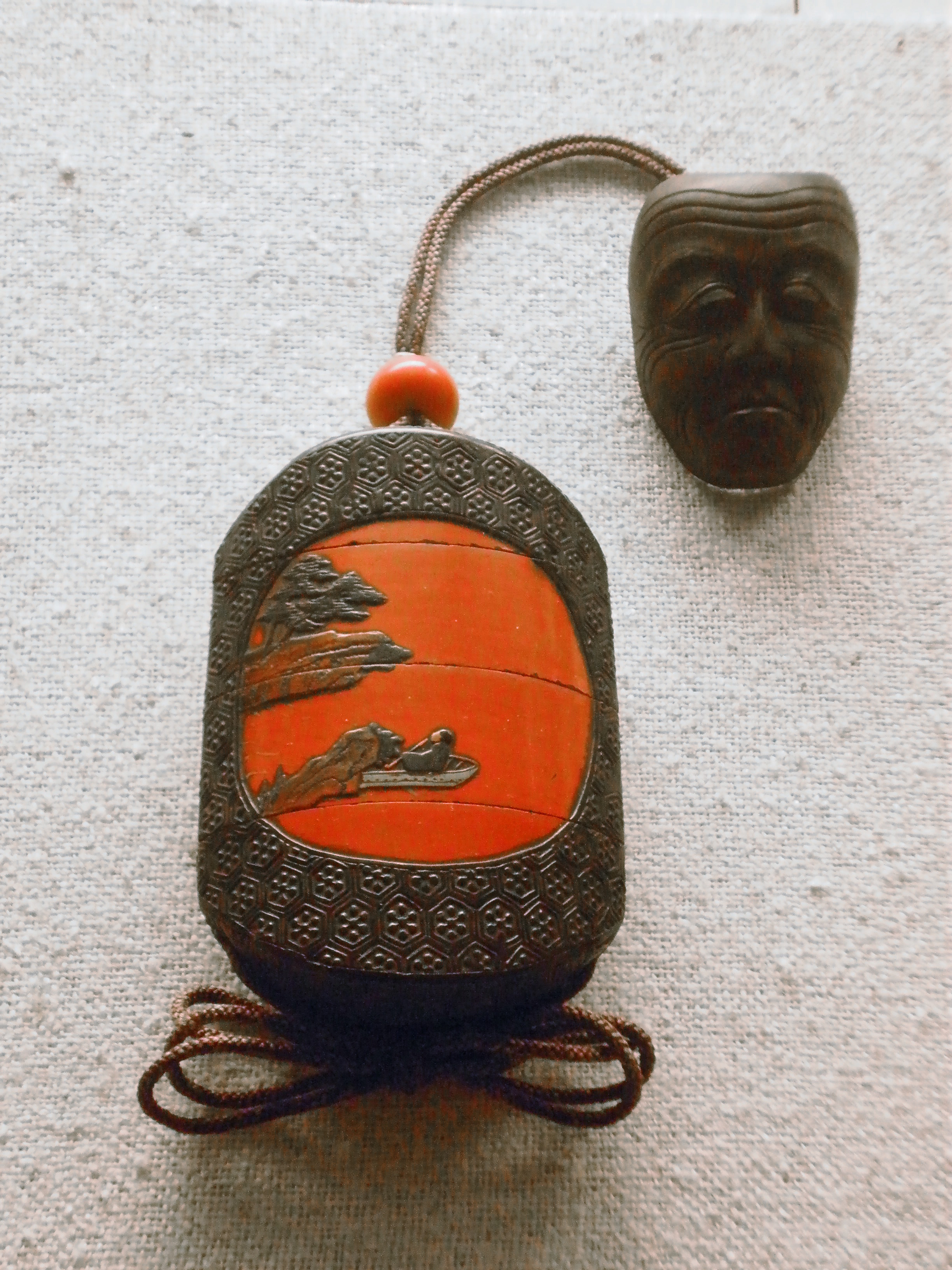
Inro, ojime and netsuke. Lacquer inro, stained ivory ojime and wooden netsuke; inro features a reclining figure in a boat; netsuke is in the form of a mask, by Ikkan (ca. 1750-1850)

He was from Nagoya, Owari province, central Japan.

He was part of a group of carvers in Nagoya, amongst who were Masayuki (正行), Masatoshi, Masatami and Masamitsu. The Nagoya school was established earlier in the 18th century under Tametaka.

His pieces can be found in many museum collections and achieve high prices at auctions.

== See also ==
- Tametaka
- Gechū
- Masanao of Kyoto

== Bibliography ==
- Frederick Meinertzhagen, The Meinertzhagen Card Index on Netsuke in the Archives of the British Museum, Alan R. Liss, Inc., New York, 1986, p.212.
- Bandini, Rosemary (2019) The Larry Caplan Collection of Japanese Netsuke, p. 52, no. 27.
