= Netsuke =

Type of bead used to secure an inro in one's belt

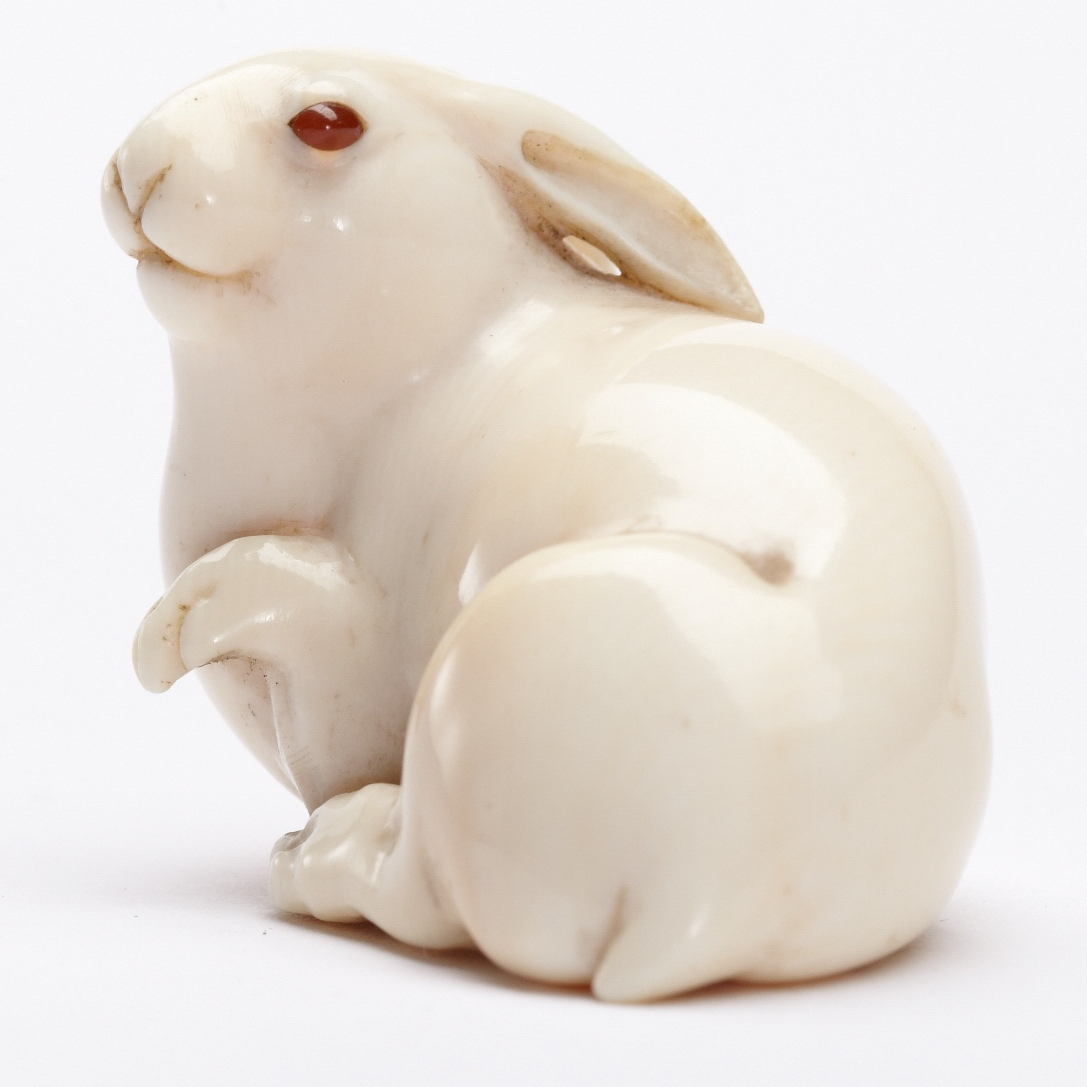
The Hare with Amber Eyes netsuke, by Masatoshi, Osaka, c. 1880, signed. Ivory, amber buffalo horn

A netsuke (根付; [netsɯ̥ke]) is a miniature sculpture, originating in 17th century Japan. Initially a simply-carved button fastener on the cords of an inrō box, netsuke later developed into ornately sculpted objects of craftsmanship.

== History ==
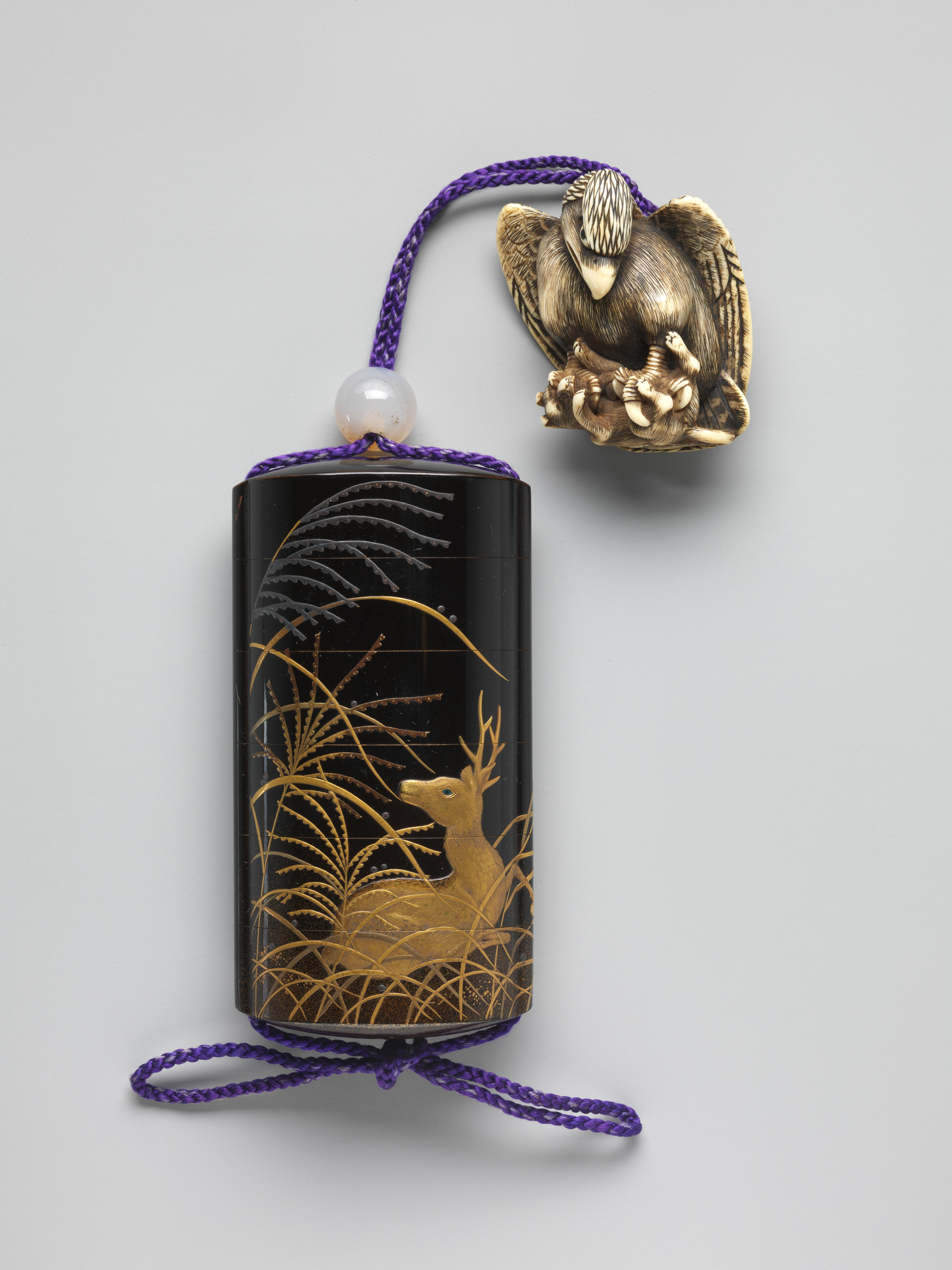
An ivory netsuke with an eagle design and an inrō with a deer design. The combination of netsuke and inrō creates a story of an eagle preying on deer. Edo period, 18th century

Traditionally, Japanese clothing – first the kosode and its later evolution, the kimono – did not have pockets. Though the sleeves of the kimono could be used to store small items, the men who wore kimono needed a larger and stronger container in which to store personal belongings, such as pipes, tobacco, money and seals, resulting in the development of containers known as sagemono, which were hung by cords from the robes' sashes (obi).

These containers may have been pouches or small woven baskets, but the most popular were crafted boxes (inrō) held shut by ojime, sliding beads on cords. Whatever the form of the container, the fastener which secured the cord at the top of the sash was a carved, button-like toggle called a netsuke. Netsuke, like inrō and ojime, evolved over time from being strictly utilitarian into objects of great artistic merit and an expression of extraordinary craftsmanship. Netsuke production was most popular during the Edo period (1603–1867).

Netsuke and inrō declined as Japanese clothes were gradually westernized from the Meiji period (1868–1912). Because of their popularity amongst Western collectors at the time, some of the greatest collections are now found outside of Japan.

Today, the production of netsuke continues, and some modern netsuke can command high prices in the UK, Europe, the US, Japan and elsewhere. Inexpensive yet faithful reproductions are available in museums and souvenir shops.

== Etymology ==
The term netsuke is formed from the characters ne (根, meaning 'base') and tsuke (付, meaning 'attached'). In American English, the word is usually italicized, while it is usually unitalicized in British English.

== Forms ==
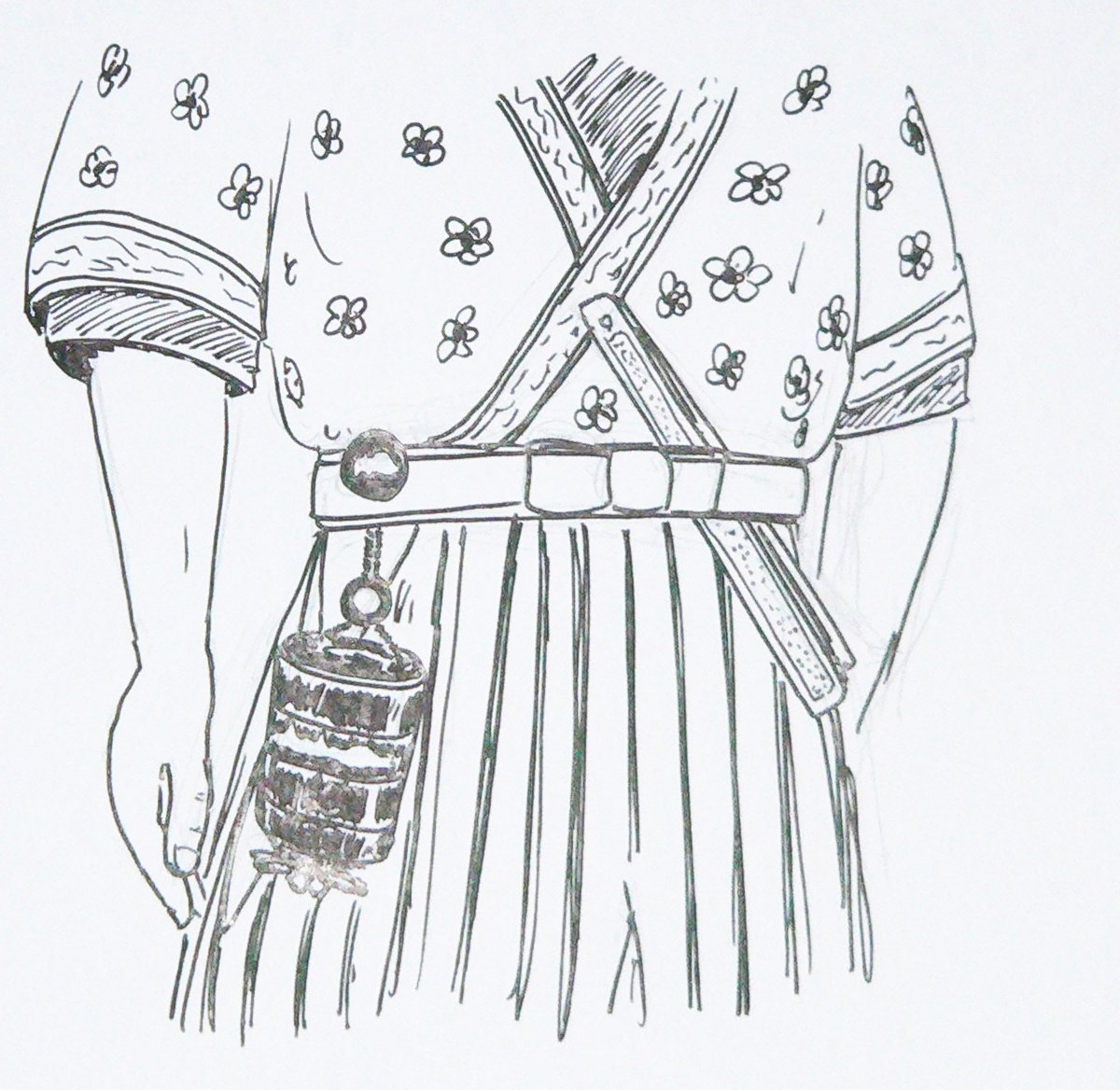
Drawing of a man wearing an inrō supported by a netsuke passed through the ties of his hakama.

Anabori-netsuke (穴彫根付, or "hollowed netsuke")
Subset of katabori which are carved out for a hollow center. Clams are most commonly the motifs for this type of netsuke.
Kagamibuta-netsuke (鏡蓋根付, or "mirror-lid netsuke")
Shaped like a manjū, but with a metal disc serving as a lid to a shallow bowl, usually of ivory. The metal is often highly decorated with a wide variety of metallurgical techniques.
Karakuri-netsuke (からくり根付, or "trick/mechanism netsuke")
Any netsuke that has moving parts or hidden surprises.
Katabori-netsuke (形彫根付, or "sculpture netsuke")
This is the most common type of netsuke. They are compact three-dimensional figures carved in a round shape and are usually around one to three inches high.
Manjū-netsuke (饅頭根付)
A thick, flat, round netsuke, with carving usually done in relief, sometimes made of two ivory halves. Shaped like a manjū bun, a Japanese confection.
Men-netsuke (面根付, or "mask netsuke")
The largest category after katabori. These were often imitations of full-size Noh masks and share characteristics in common with both katabori and manjū/kagamibuta.
Obi-hasami
Another elongated netsuke with a curved top and bottom. It sits behind the obi with the curved ends visible above and below the obi.
Ryūsa-netsuke (柳左根付)
Shaped like a manjū, but carved like lace, so that light is transmitted through the item.
Sashi-netsuke (差根付)
This is an elongated form of katabori, literally "stab" netsuke, similar in length to the sticks and gourds used as improvised netsuke before carved pieces were produced. They are about 6 inches (150 mm) long.

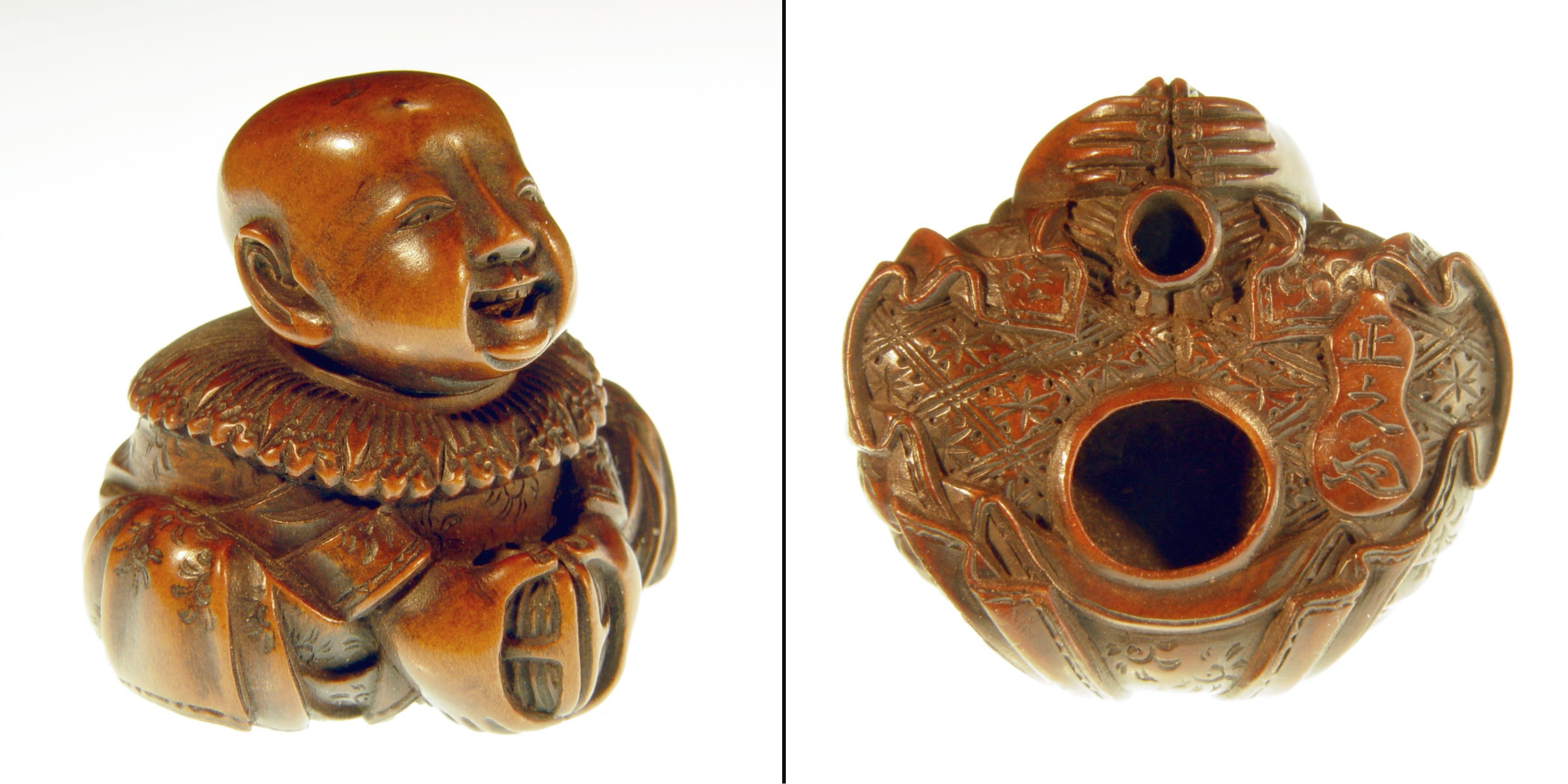
Katabori-netsuke front and rear view with two holes for cord

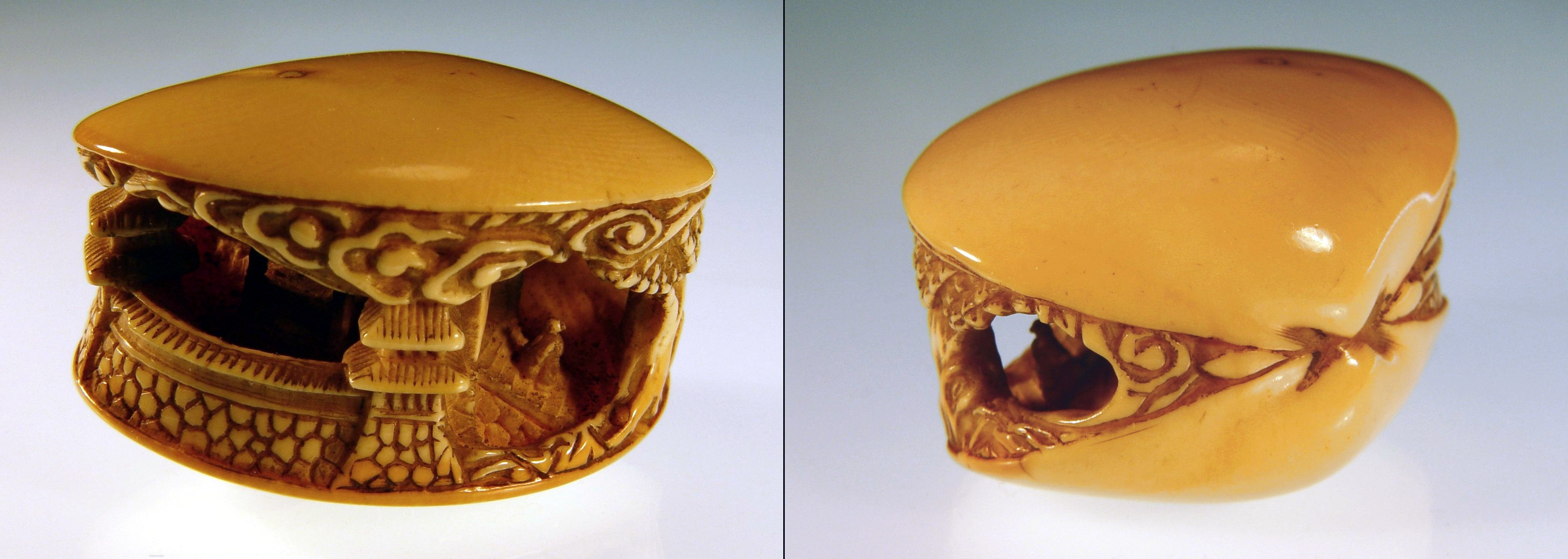
Anabori-netsuke

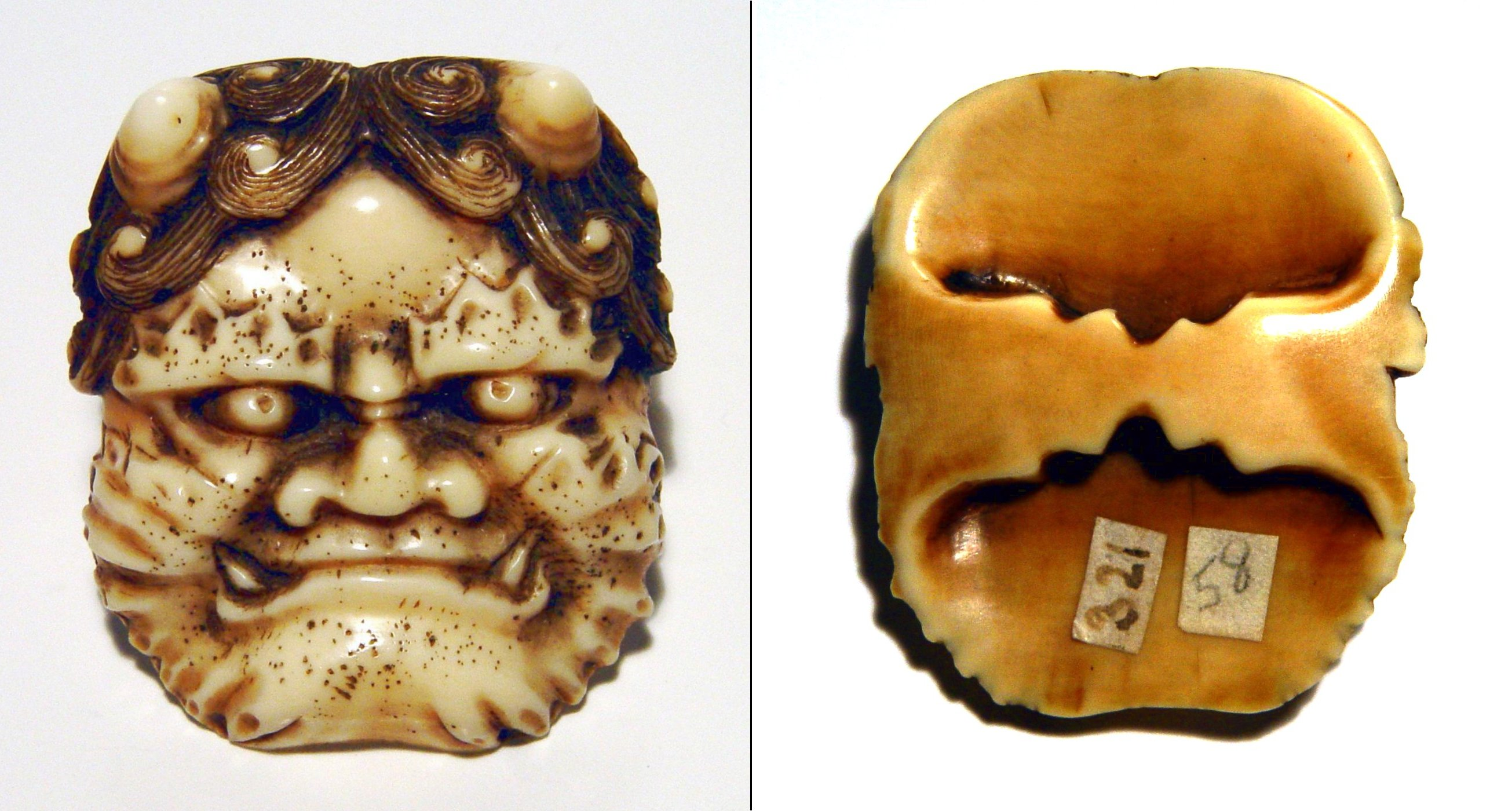
Mask netsuke

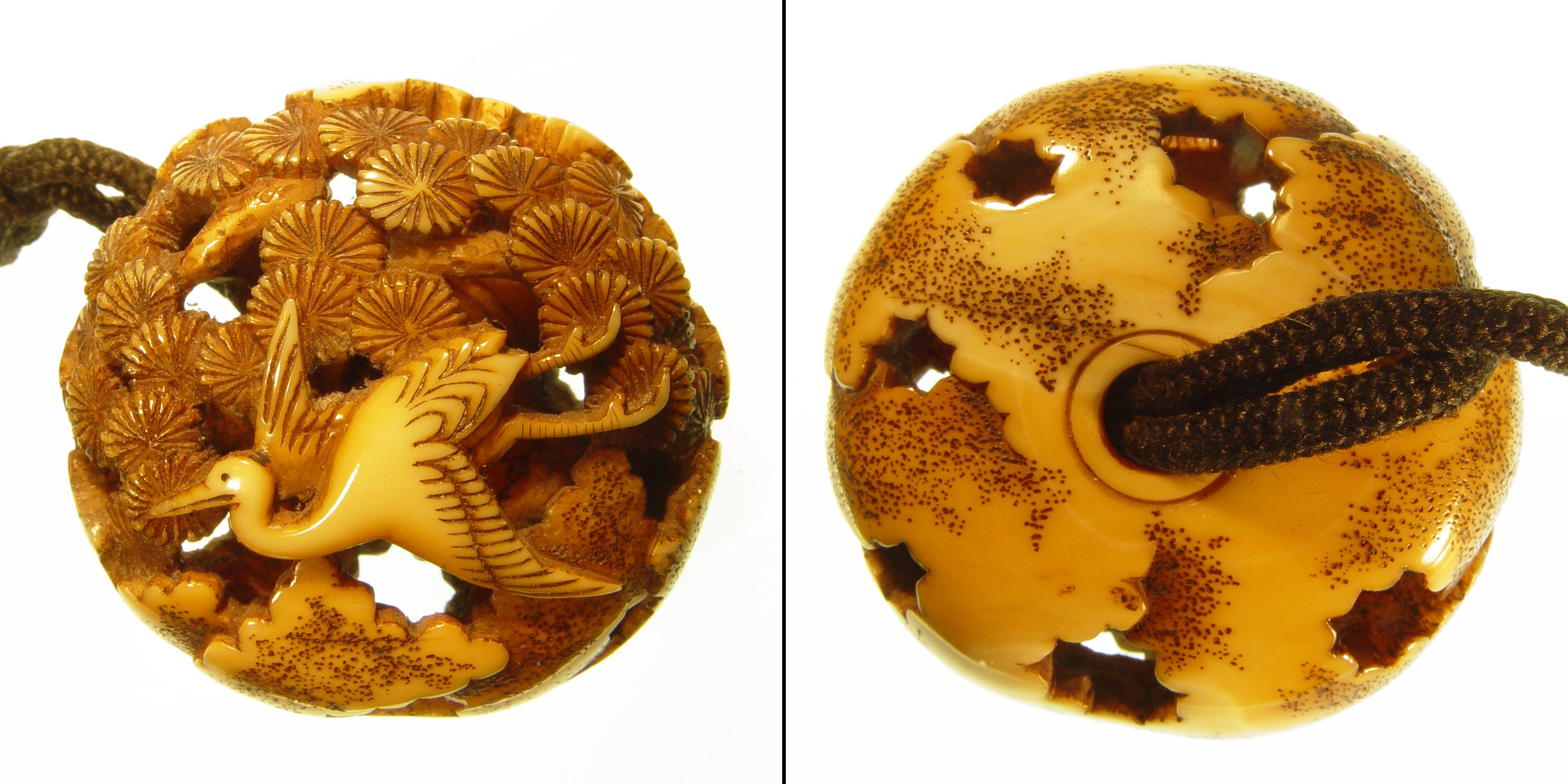
Ryūsa-netsuke

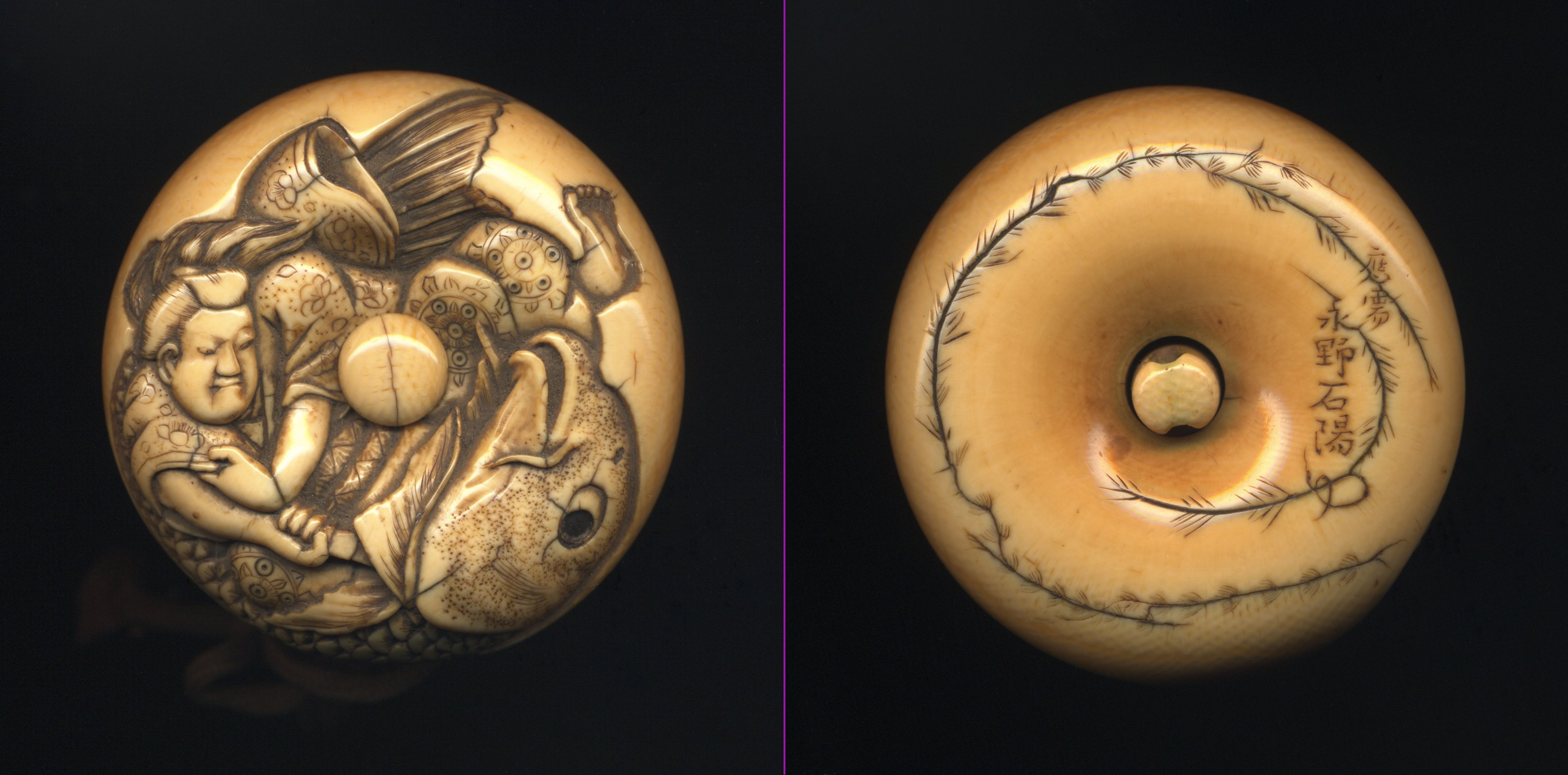
Manjū-netsuke

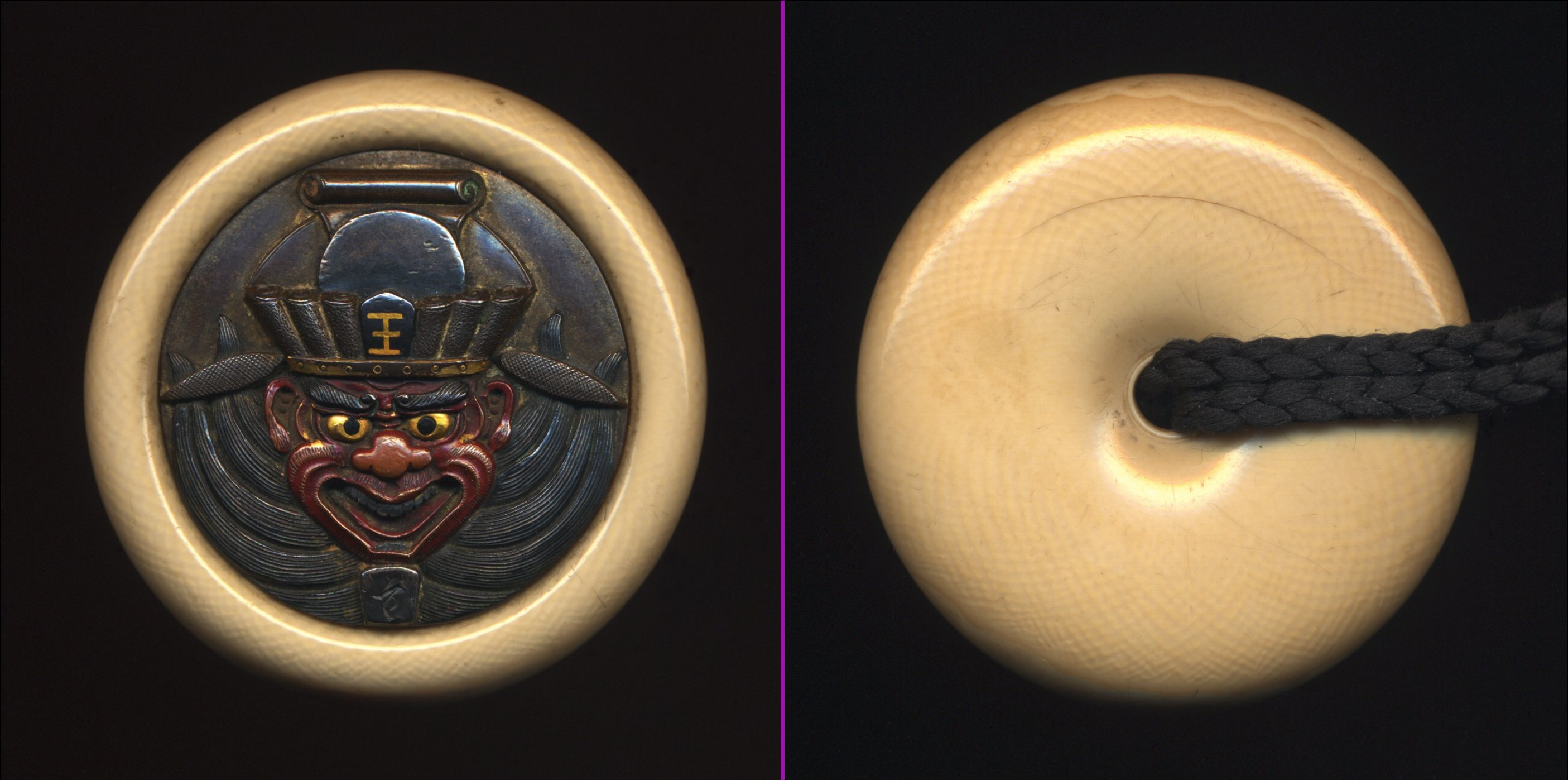
Kagamibuta-netsuke

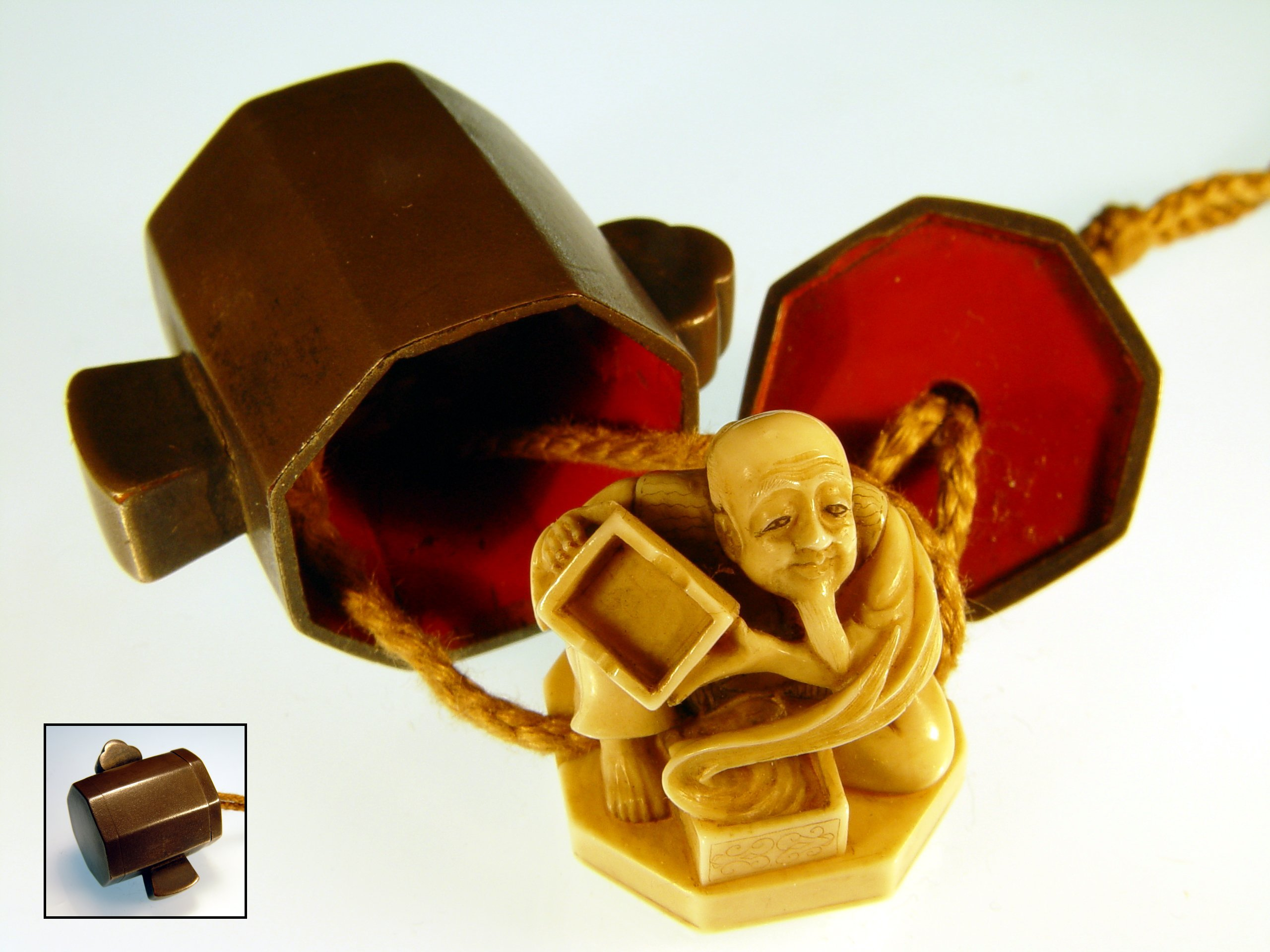
Trick netsuke

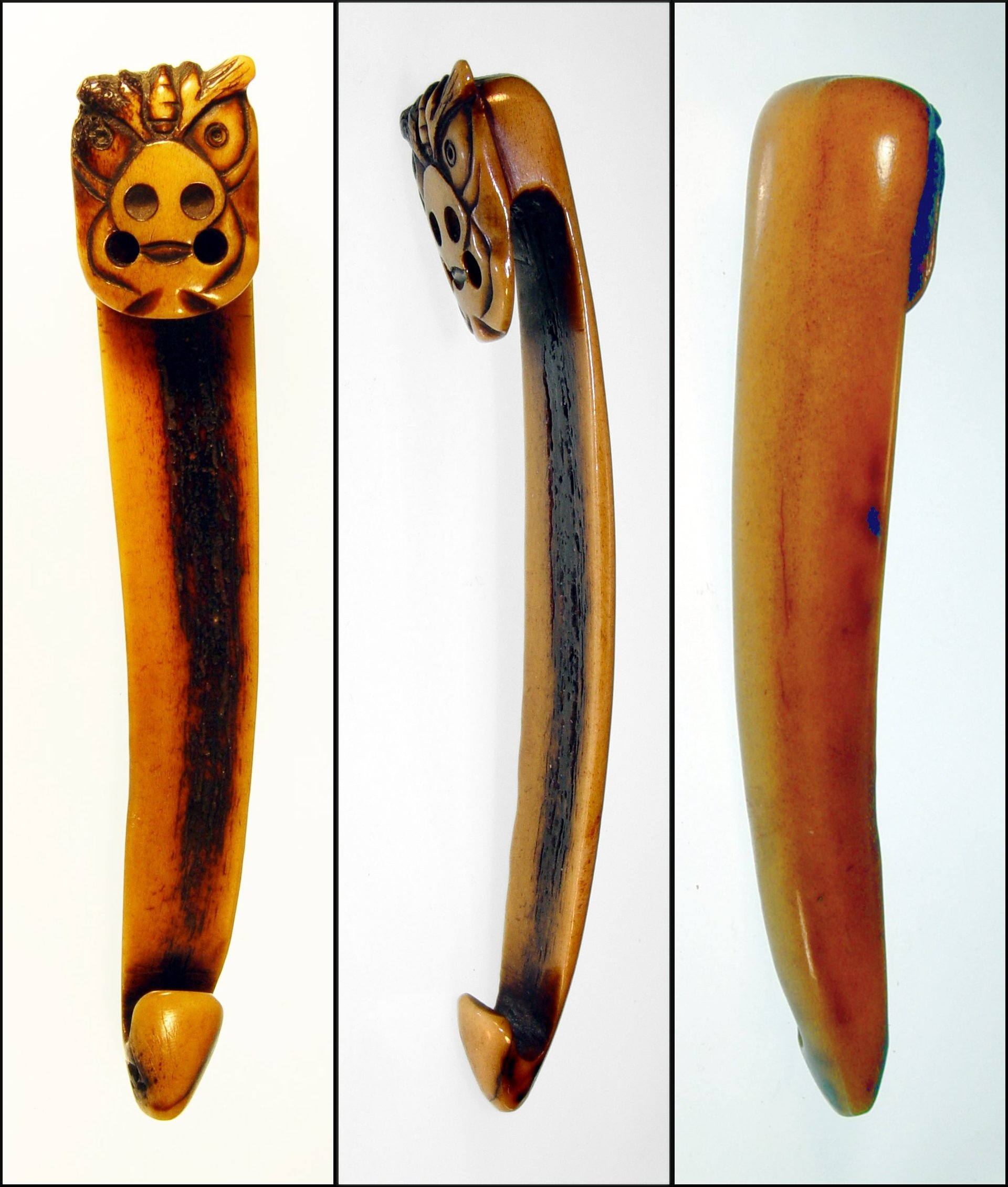
Obi-hasami sashi-netsuke

== Materials ==
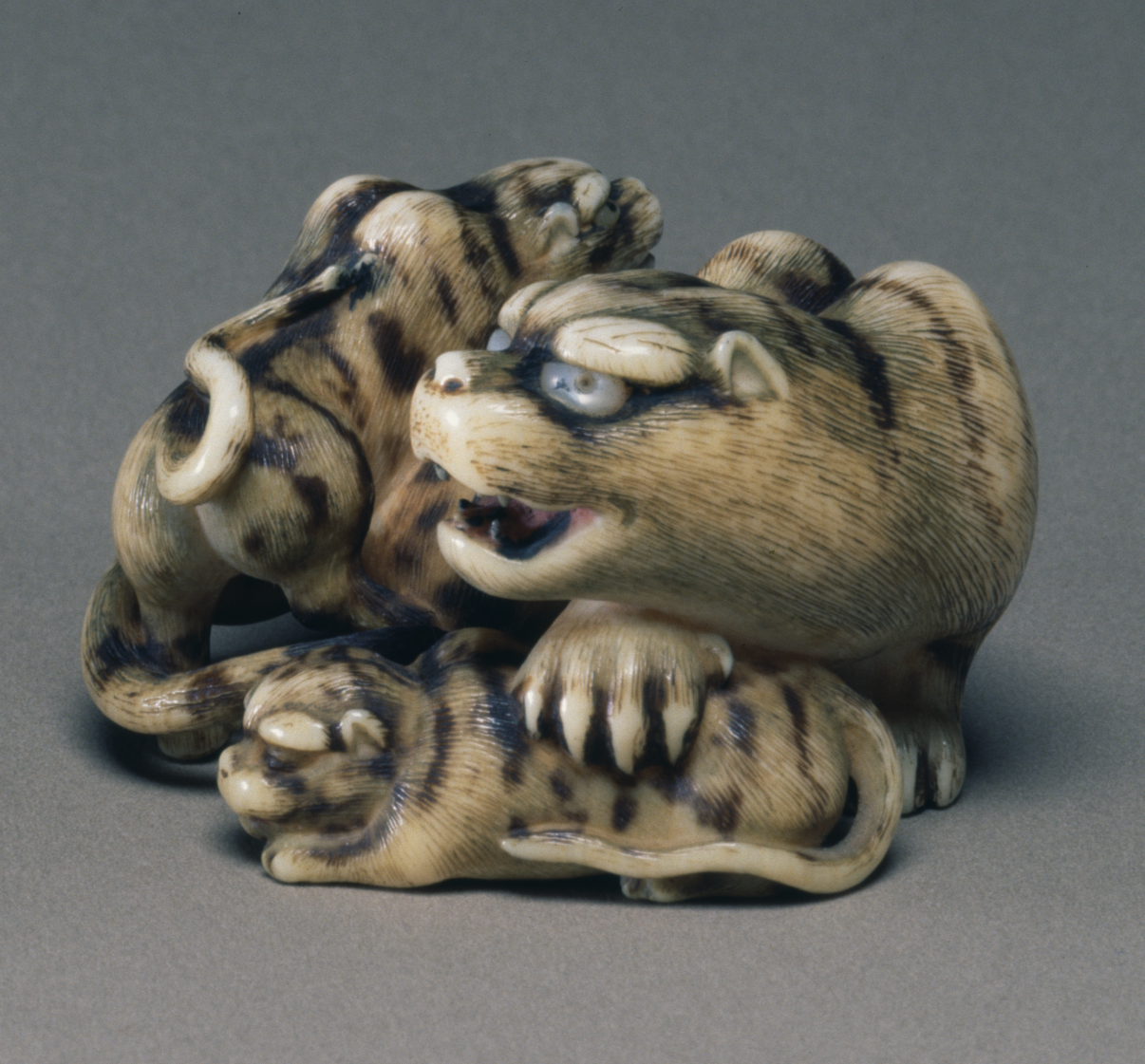
Netsuke of tigress with two cubs, mid-19th century, ivory with shell inlay

- Ivory – the most common material used before ivory from live animals became illegal. Netsuke made from mammoth ivory (huge quantities still exist in the Near East and Siberia) fill part of the tourist trade demand today.
- Boxwood, other hardwoods – popular materials in Edo Japan and still used today
- Metal – used as accents in many netsuke and kagamibuta lids
- Hippopotamus tooth – used today in lieu of ivory
- Boar tusk – mostly used by Iwami carvers
- Rhinoceros horn
- Clay/porcelain
- Lacquer
- Cane (woven)

=== Unusual materials ===
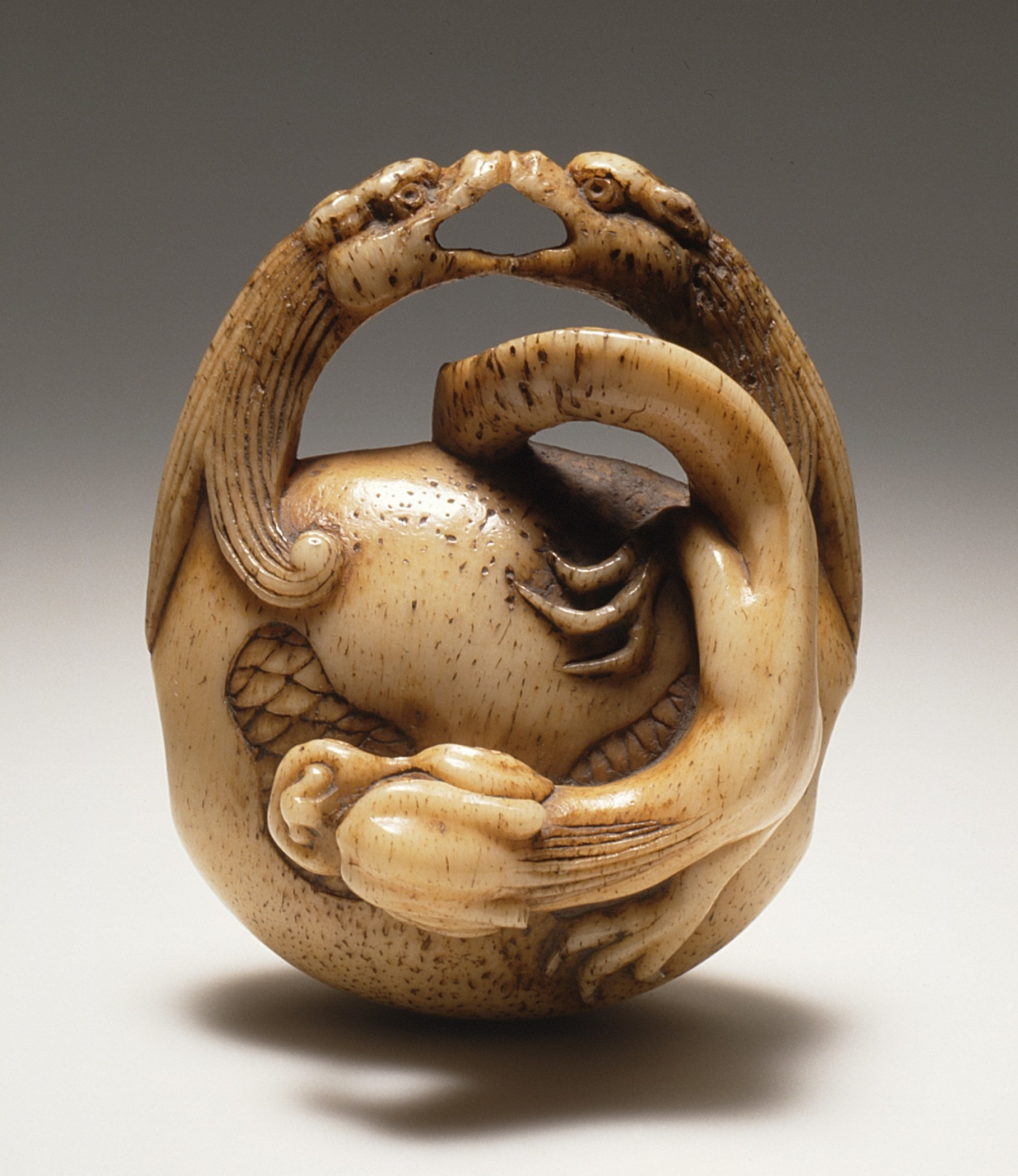
Dragons on gong, stag antler, LACMA

- Hornbill ivory: of the many species of hornbill, only the helmeted hornbill (Rhinoplax vigil) furnishes an ivory-like substance. This is a dense, carvable substance that makes up the solid casque growing above the upper mandible (from the bird's forehead). It is not ivory, horn, nor bone, yet it has been called ivory for many centuries. It is softer than real ivory and is a creamy yellow in color, becoming red at the top and sides.
- Umimatsu: a species of black coral with dense texture, concentric growth rings, and amber and reddish colored inclusions in the black material. According to Michael Birch, "the literal translation of umimatsu is 'sea pine', and it is also popularly described as 'black coral'. True coral, however, is a hard calcareous substance secreted by marine polyps for habitation. Umimatsu, on the other hand is a colony of keratinous antipatharian marine organisms."
- Umoregi: there are several definitions, some contradictory: According to Bushell, "Umoregi is a partially fossilized wood, having the general appearance of ebony but showing no grain." Often called fossilized wood, umoregi is not properly a wood, but a "jet" (a variety of lignite), that is often confused with ebony. It is a shiny material that takes an excellent polish, but it has a tendency to split. Umoregi is petrified wood formed when cedar and pine trees from the Tertiary Age (5 million years ago) were buried underground and then carbonized. The layers of earth where umoregi-zaiku can be found extend under the Aobayama and Yagiyama sections of Sendai, Japan. Pieces made from this material are generally dark brown with a beautiful wood grain and the soft luster of lacquer.
- Walrus tusk: walrus have two large tusks (elongated canine teeth) projecting downward from the upper jaw. These tusks, often reaching two feet in length, have been extensively carved as ivory for centuries in many countries and especially in Japan. Walrus tusk carvings are usually easy to identify, because much of the interior of the tooth is filled with a mottled, almost translucent substance that is harder and more resistant to carving than the rest of the tooth. Manjū, especially ryūsa manjū, invariably show this translucent material at opposite edges of the netsuke.
- Baleen: the sperm whale has teeth running the whole length of its enormous lower jaw. Those in the middle tend to be the largest, often obtaining a length of more than six to eight inches. These larger ones are often used by carvers of scrimshaw.
- Whale's bone: all bones are hollow, the cavity being filled with a spongy material. Cuts across some bone show a pattern of minute holes looking like dark dots. Lengthwise, such bone displays many narrow channels which appear to be dark lines of varying lengths. Polished, bone is more opaque and less shiny than ivory.
- Teeth: a variety of other teeth are used for netsuke, including: boars', bears', and even tigers'.
- Tagua nut: the nut from the ivory palm (Phytelephas aequatorialis), often referred to as vegetable ivory. Part of the nut's shell sometimes remains on netsuke carvings. Though often mistaken for or deceptively sold as elephant ivory, items made from the two-to-three-inch nut have none of the striations common to animal ivory, and sometimes the ivory-like nut flesh has a light yellow cast under a rough coconut-shell-like external covering. The nut is very hard when dry, but easily worked into artistic items when wet.
- Walnut (or kurumi – natural walnut shell): in the above photo, a rare example of the kataborinetsuke style, the meat from the nut was removed by various means, one being the insertion of a small worm in a hole in the nut to consume the meat. Following that, elaborate designs were carved, and the string inserted. The carver often removed all of the nut's normal surface features and carved through the surface in places to create a latticed effect. Once carved, the resulting netsuke was polished and shellacked.
- Bamboo: "bamboo (Iyo bamboo) is used for netsuke. Bamboo netsuke are either a piece of the stem or the root with carving on it." According to Bernard Rosett: "carvings in the round are usually made from the underground stem of the plant, that small almost solid zone that connects to the creeping rhizome below the ground. Bamboo netsuke are not commonly encountered. Occasionally, one comes across a netsuke fashioned from bamboo root and can revel in the wonderful texture and patina of the material."
- Agate: a mineral, streaked with many colors, and which can be given a high polish.
- Ivorine: a material made from the dust created when carving legally obtained new ivory, mammoth ivory, tusks, and teeth, which is then mixed with a clear resin and compressed as it hardens. This was one of the many solutions to the demand of the tourist market trade for netsuke carvings after trade in new ivory became illegal. Once hard and dry, ivorine can be carved in exactly the same way as ivory. Though often deceptively sold to the modern tourist trade as elephant ivory, items made from ivorine have none of the striations common to animal ivory, though sometimes, the carving is artificially aged to have the yellowed appearance common to true old ivory carvings.

== Subjects ==
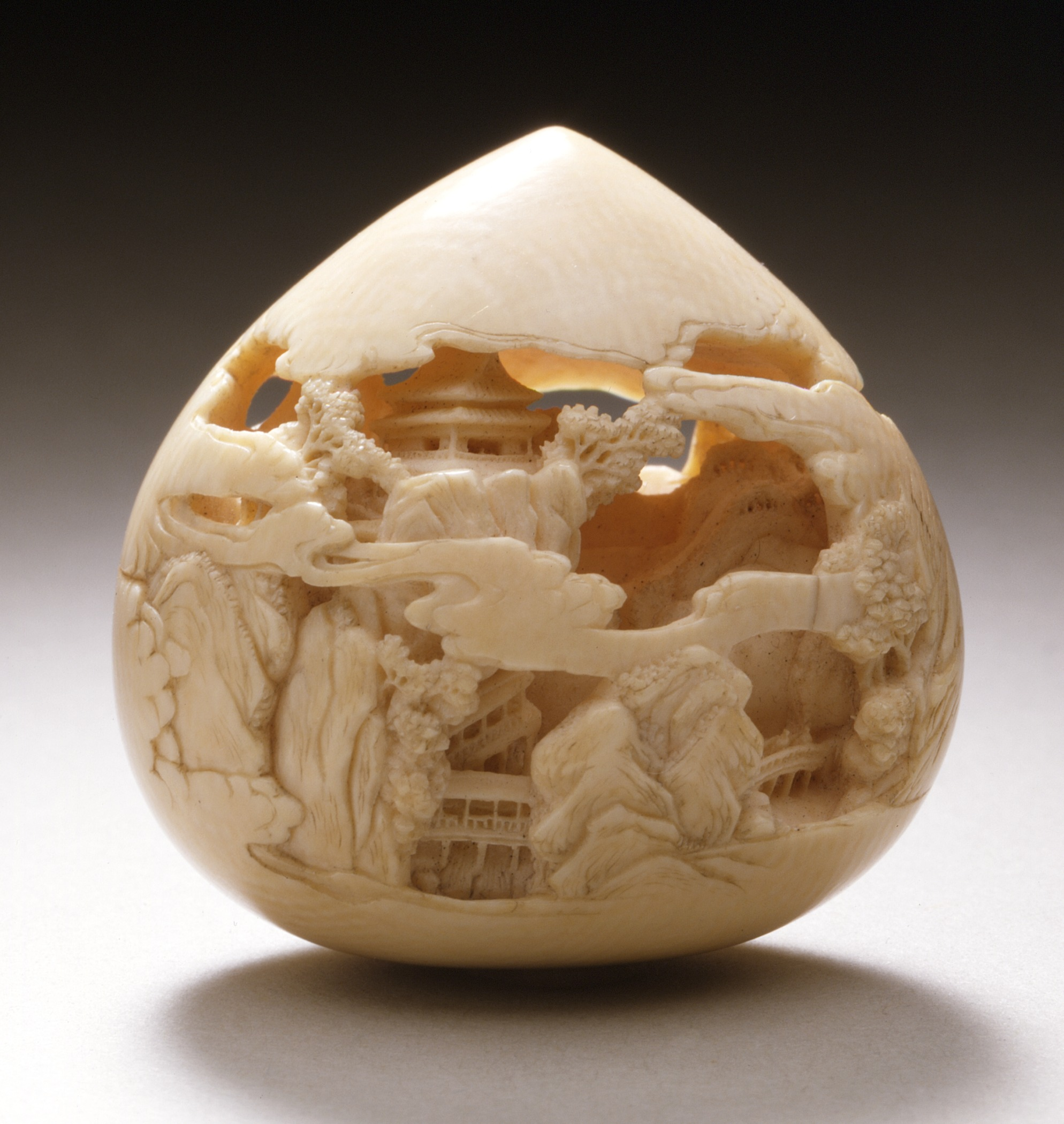
Jewel of Wisdom carved with mountain pavilions. Stained ivory

Like many other art forms, netsuke reflect the nature of the society that produced them. This effect is particularly pronounced in netsuke, owing to long periods of isolation imposed both by geography and internal politics and limited avenues of self-expression for Japanese citizens due to custom and law. As a result, netsuke display every aspect of Japanese culture, including its rich folklore and religion, crafts, trades, and professions, all types of people and creatures, both real and imagined, and every kind of object. As in other aspects of Japanese culture, the subjects portrayed by netsuke trend, over the long term, away from an initial emphasis on motifs of Chinese derivation toward a focus on objects of more strictly national interest.

- People – famous and anonymous, current, historical, real and fictitious, children, warriors, priests, etc.
- Craft, trades, professions – often depicting actions (fishermen catching fish, woodcutters cutting wood), or examples (i.e., a stylized apple for an orchardist or apple merchant).
- Animals – zodiac animals and others. It is worth noting that traditional netsuke style depicts octopus figures as having a tube-like siphon protruding from the "face", similar to a mouth. If one examines closely, one will find that some octopuses have nine tentacles instead of eight. These octopuses will usually be found embracing beautiful women.
- Plants or plant products – small ones, such as beans or chestnuts, are often carved actual size.
- Deities and mythical creatures – often from Chinese mythology and religion, and Seven Lucky Gods, are the seven gods of good fortune in Japanese mythology and folklore.
- Non-living things – the smallest category. Common examples include roof tiles, coins, and tools.
- Abstract – mon patterns and other designs.
- Sexual – shunga netsuke may depict a male and female in sexual conjugation or may contain only subtle or symbolic sexual references.

Some netsuke represent single, simple, objects, and some depict entire scenes from history, mythology, or literature.

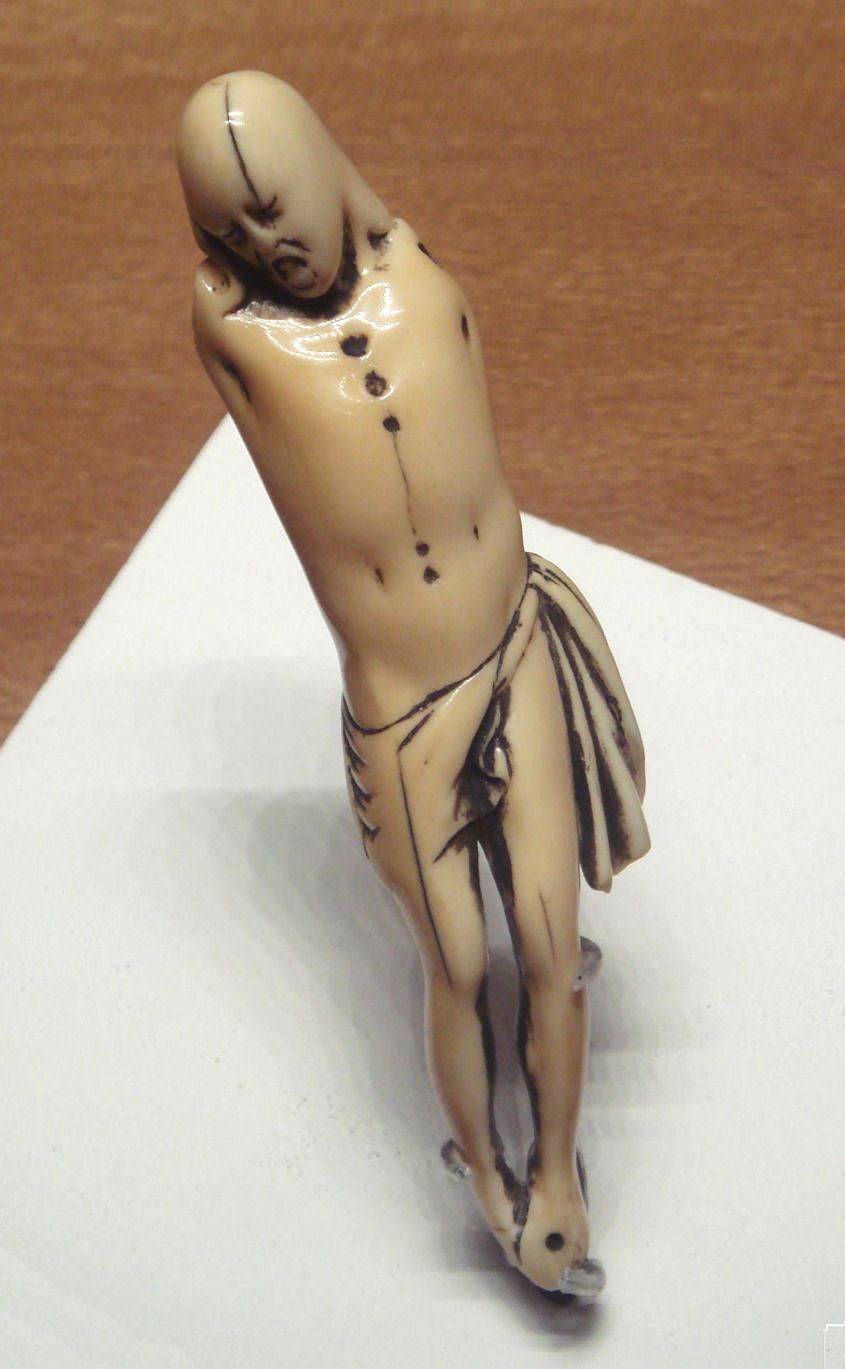
Kirishitan netsuke depicting Christ, 17th century

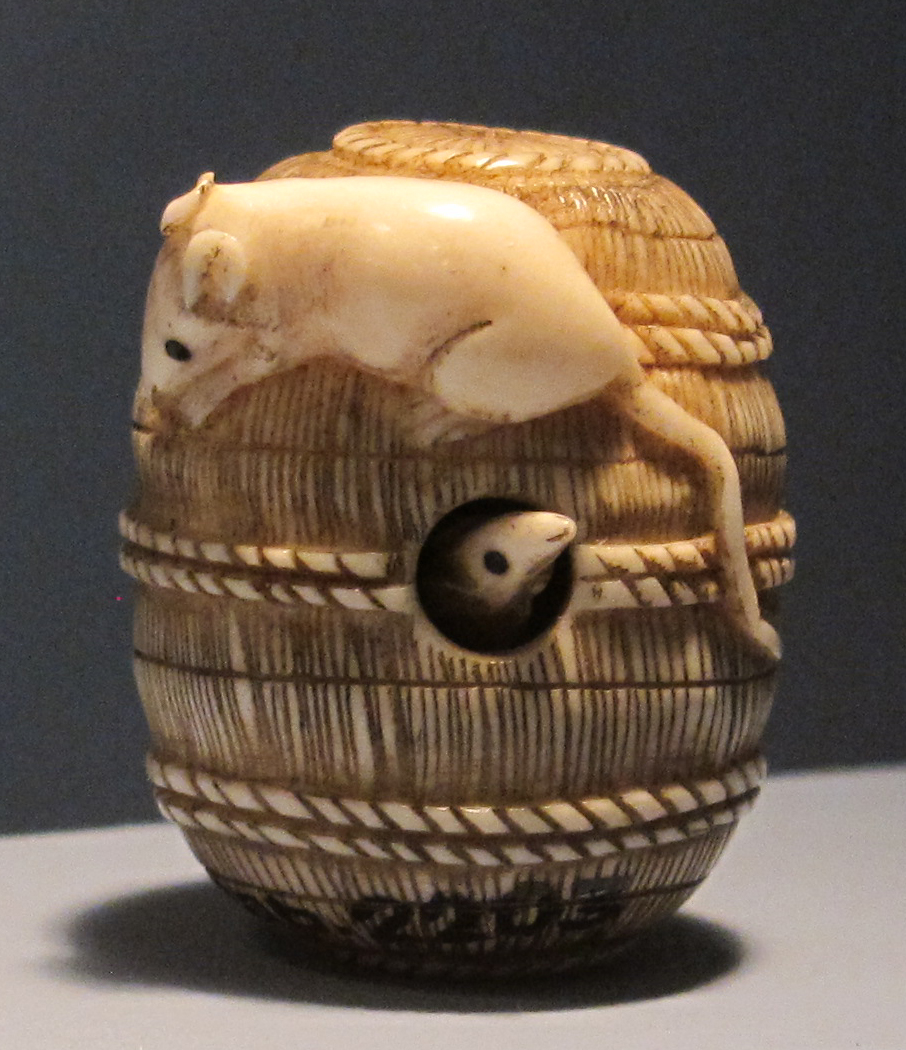
Mouse on barrel

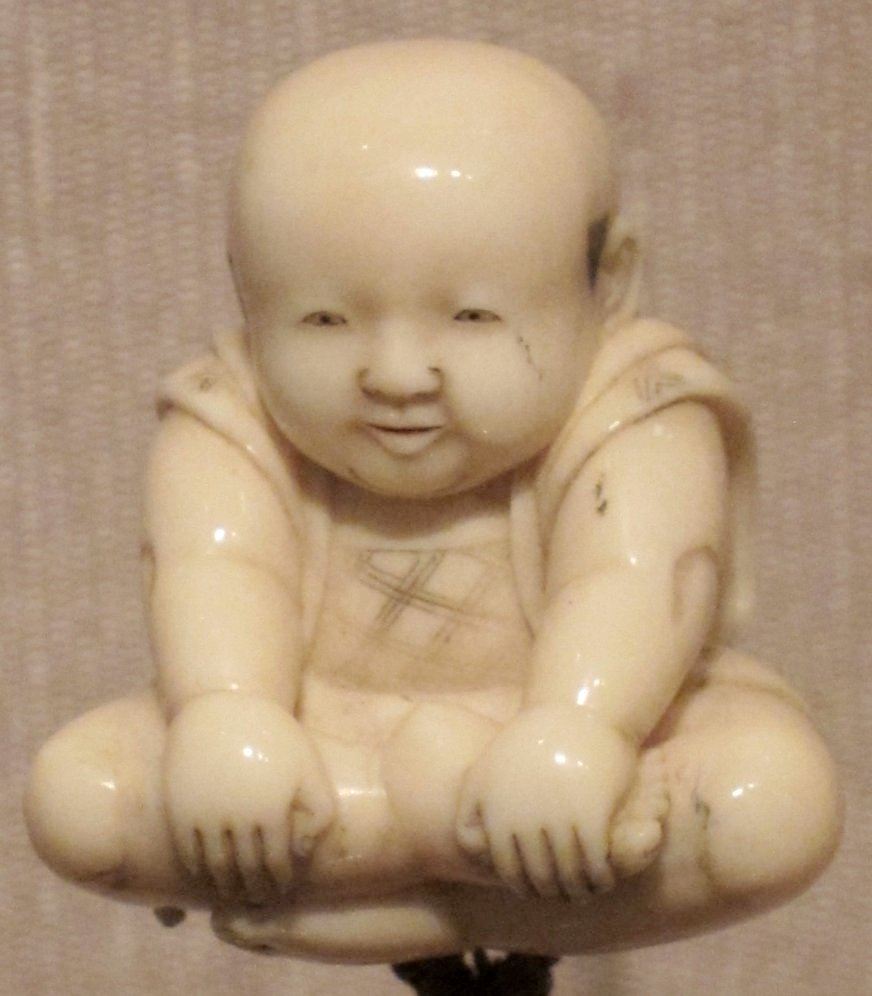
Ivory netsuke with sitting boy

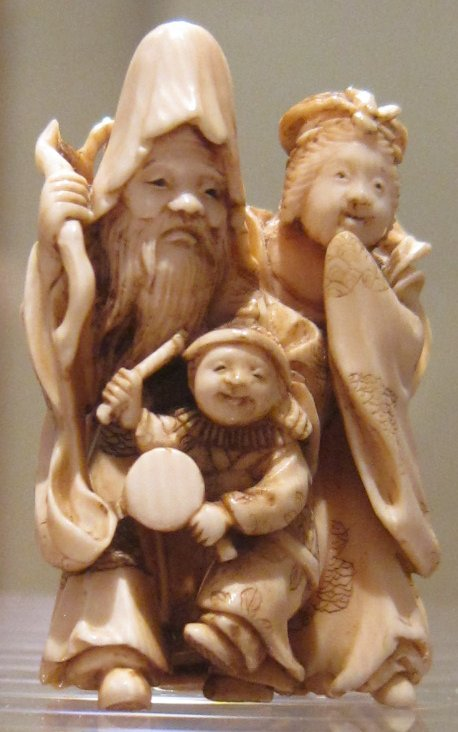
Fukurokuju, Benten and boy

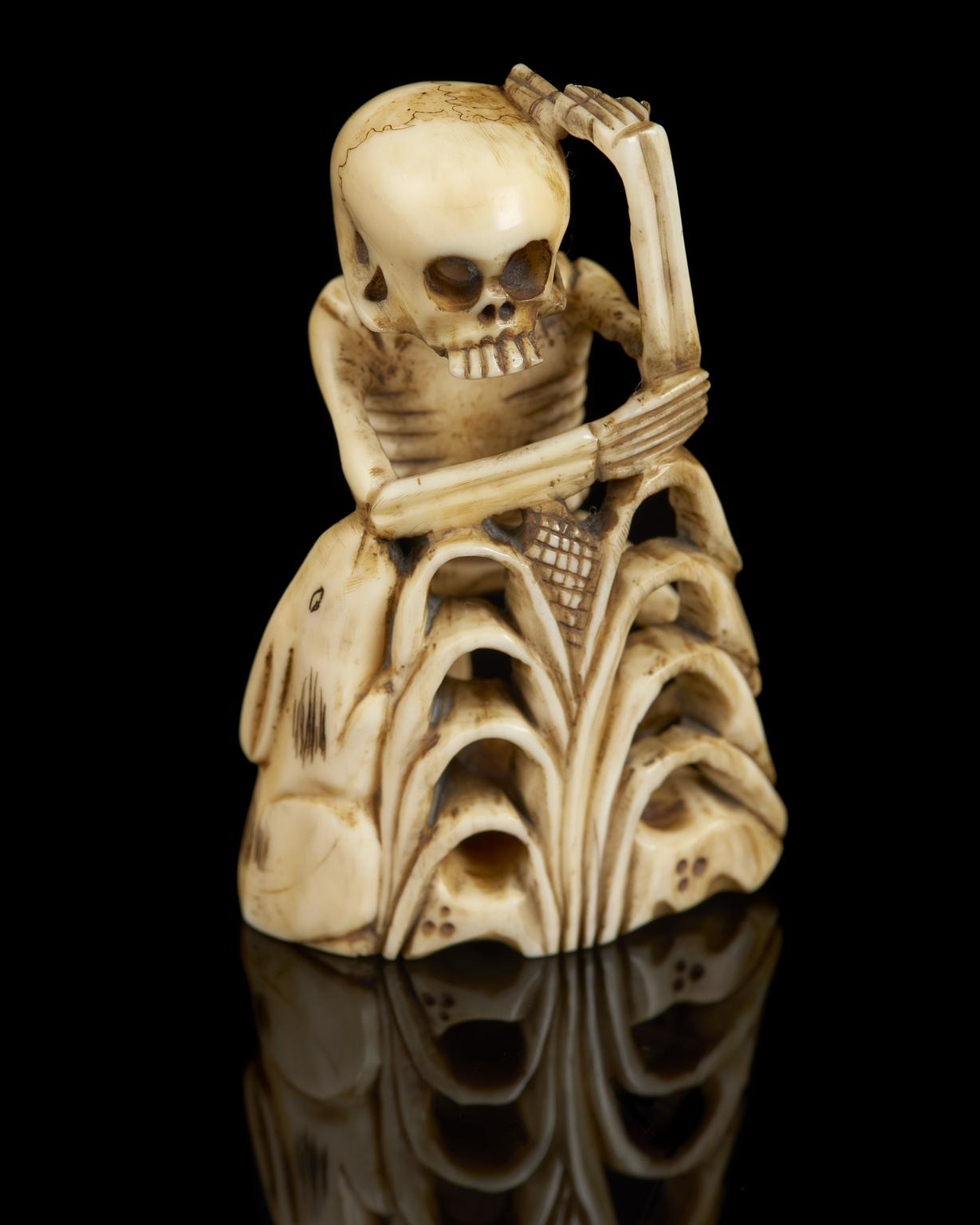
Ivory netsuke, in the form of a skeleton, 18th to 19th century

== Artists ==
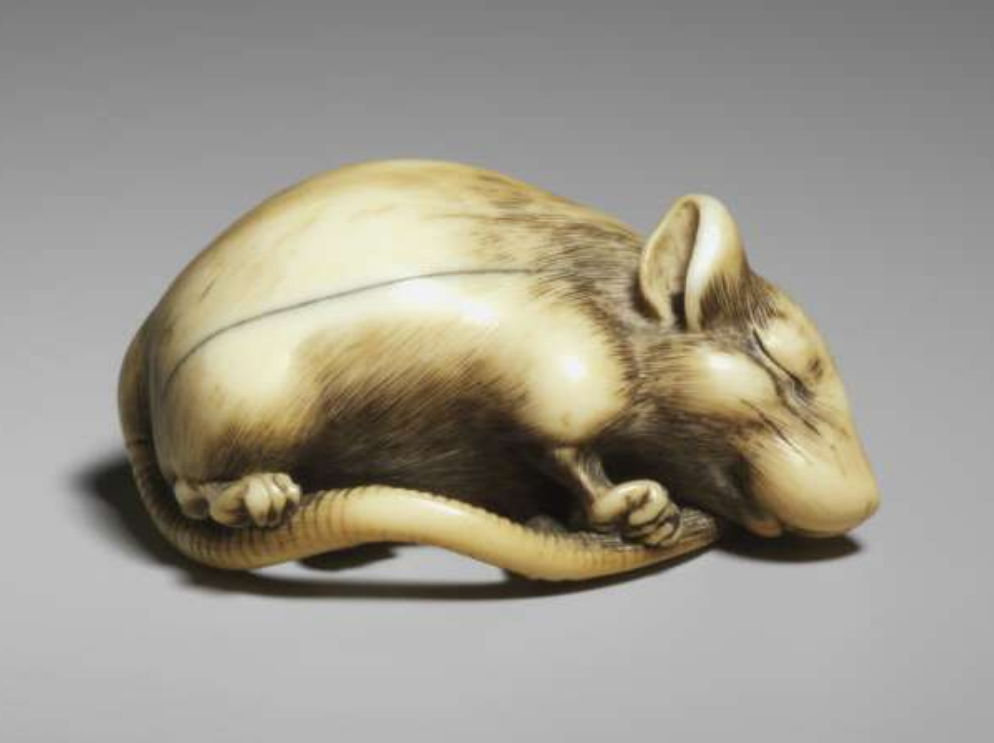
Carved netsuke of a sleeping rat, made out of ivory, by Masanao of Kyoto

Carvers of netsuke are called netsuke-shi. Sōken Kishō (装劍奇賞) is the earliest compilation of netsuke-shi, which lists over 50 netsuke masters. It was published in Osaka in 1781 by Inaba Tsūryū. Some works of art are even illustrated in it.

One of the most renowned artists during the Edo period was the founder of the Nagoya school, Tametaka (為隆), who is listed in the Sōken Kishō. He was followed in Nagoya by Ikkan (一貫). His pieces can be found in many collections and achieve high prices at auctions.

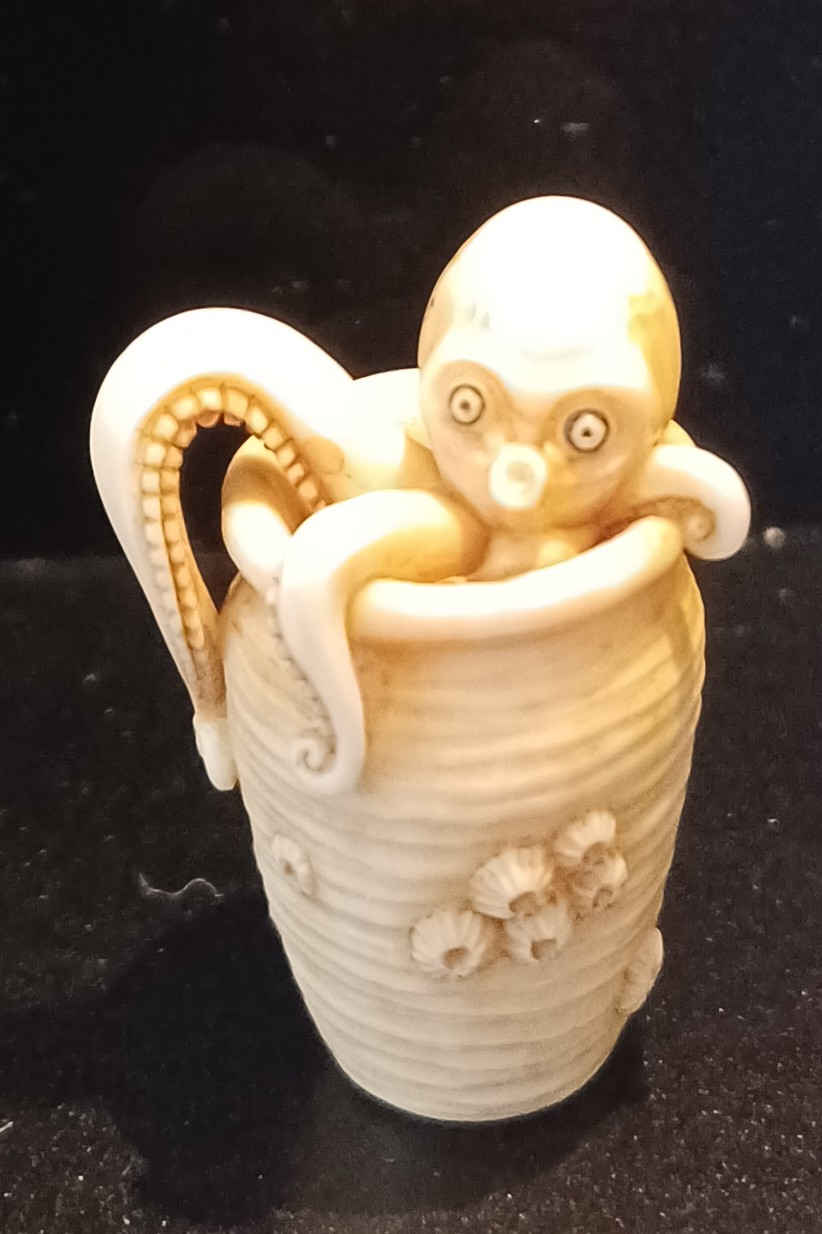
Octopus, octopus pot and barnacles. 19th century netsuke. Museum of Far Eastern Antiquities, Stockholm.

The listed masters in the Sōken Kishō are:

- Hōgen Shūzan (法眼周山)
- Unju Tōshumemaru (雲樹洞院幣丸)
- Ogasawara Isai (小笠原一斎)
- Miwa (三輪)
- Waryū (和流)
- Myōgaya Seishichi (荷屋清七)
- Kurobē (九郎兵衛)
- Negoro Sōkyū (根来宗休)
- Tatsuki Kanzō (龍木勘蔵)
- Mata Uemon (又有衛門)
- Unpo Kajun (雲浦可順)
- Minkō (岷江/花押)
- Haruchika (春周)
- Tomotada (友忠)
- Kanjūrō (勘十郎)
- Tawaraya Denbē (田原屋傳兵衛)
- Garaku (我楽)
- Tametaka (為隆)
- Kawai Yoritake (河井頼武)
- Sōtaka Heishirō (草荏平四郎)
- Hōgen Shūgetsu (法眼舟月)
- Hōshin (奉真)
- Satake Sōshichi (佐武宗七)
- Ryūsa (柳左)
- Kōyōken Yoshinaga (廣葉軒吉長)
- Jūzō (十蔵)
- Shibata Ichibē (柴田市郎兵衛)
- Masanao (正直)
- Okatomo (岡友)
- Inzai (印齋)
- Zeraku (是楽)
- Sanko (三小)
- Yoshibē (吉兵衛)
- Tsuji (辻)
- Mata Tomofusa (畑友房)
- Jirobē (次郎兵衛)
- Kame Hiyago (亀肥谷後)
- Washōin (和性院)
- Seibē (清兵衛)
- Gechū (牙虫)
- Ōmiya Kahē (近江屋嘉兵衛)
- Tamaharu (玉治)
- Daikoku(ya) Tōemon (大黒屋藤右衛門)
- Tomotane (友胤)
- Kashū (霞鷲)
- Nagaota Ichirō (長尾太市郎)
- Takeuchi Yasuei (竹内彌須平)
- Yoshimoto (宜元)
- Mitsuharu (光春)
- Demeuman (出目右満)
- Toshimaya Ihē (豊島屋伊兵衛)
- Karamono Kuhē (唐物久兵衛)
- Ichiraku (一楽)

Seiyōdō Tomiharu (1733–1810) was founder of the Iwami school of carving.

== Museum collections ==
The Metropolitan Museum of Art, the Los Angeles County Museum of Art, the Asian Art Museum of San Francisco, the Toledo Museum of Art, the British Museum, and the Victoria and Albert Museum have many netsuke.

In Kyoto, Japan, there is the Kyoto Seishu Netsuke Art Museum, which is the only netsuke specialized art museum in Japan. This museum is a traditional Japanese samurai residence built in the late Edo period. It has a collection of over 5,000 netsuke and 400 of them are on display and change every 3 months. The collection focuses on modern works, but there are also works from the Edo period.

The Tokyo National Museum has a small exhibition room dedicated to displaying 50 of the 500 contemporary netsuke works collected by the Prince and Princess Takamado. The Tokyo National Museum has 274 high quality items collected by Go Seinosuke (郷 誠之助; 1865–1942) and made by famous netsuke craftsmen from the Edo period to the Meiji period. They were donated by Go who was concerned that too many netsuke were exported from Japan and they were rarely seen in Japan. To mark its 150-year anniversary, the Tokyo National Museum simultaneously exhibited all 274 works from the Go collection from November 2, 2022, to January 22, 2023, and all 500 works from the Prince Takamado collection from November 15, 2022, to December 25, 2022.

== In popular culture ==
- Netsuke are a central theme in The Hare with Amber Eyes, a 2010 memoir by British ceramic artist Edmund de Waal. The book traces the history of a collection of 264 netsuke—some of them by well-known craftsmen—which were taken to France in the late 19th century, and purchased by a wealthy art collector who was a member of the Jewish Ephrussi family. They were passed down through the family's Vienna branch, where a family servant kept them hidden during the Holocaust when the Nazis confiscated the family's other possessions. In 1947, the netsuke were taken back to Japan by an heir who went to live in Tokyo.
- In episode 6 season 4 of Downton Abbey; Newley hired gardener John Pegg is accused of stealing the Dowager Countess’ netsuke that was gifted to the late Lord Grantham. The countess is shamed by cousin Isobel of being only worried about “Things! Things!”. The netsuke is later retrieved by a housemaid and Pegg is re-hired.
- A 2019 episode of Bob's Burgers entitled "The Helen Hunt" features a netsuke in the role of a MacGuffin; the Belcher family spends the episode searching for one hidden in an old apartment building in an effort to set Teddy up with rich heiress Helen.
- In 1995 Season 3 Episode 4 of the popular TV show Frasier, Niles finds out from the radio station boss Kate that the netsuke exhibit that’s in town is not showing the “really rare pieces” on account of they weren’t let out of Japan.
- Wolverine: Netsuke is a 2002-2003 Marvel Comics limited series following Wolverine being transported back to Feudal Japan after touching Mariko Yashida's netsuke.

== See also ==
- Daruma doll
- Netsuke-shi, the carvers of netsuke
- Ojime, the cord fasteners of netsuke
- Kinchaku, a traditional Japanese drawstring bag
- Chatelaine
- Reticule (handbag)
- Yatate, a pipe-shaped writing set
- Japanese handicrafts
- Gothic boxwood miniature
- Okimono, small and purely decorative sculptures, often made by the same artists who produced netsuke
