= Aktien-Gesellschaft Gladenbeck =

Bronze foundry in Berlin (1851–1926)

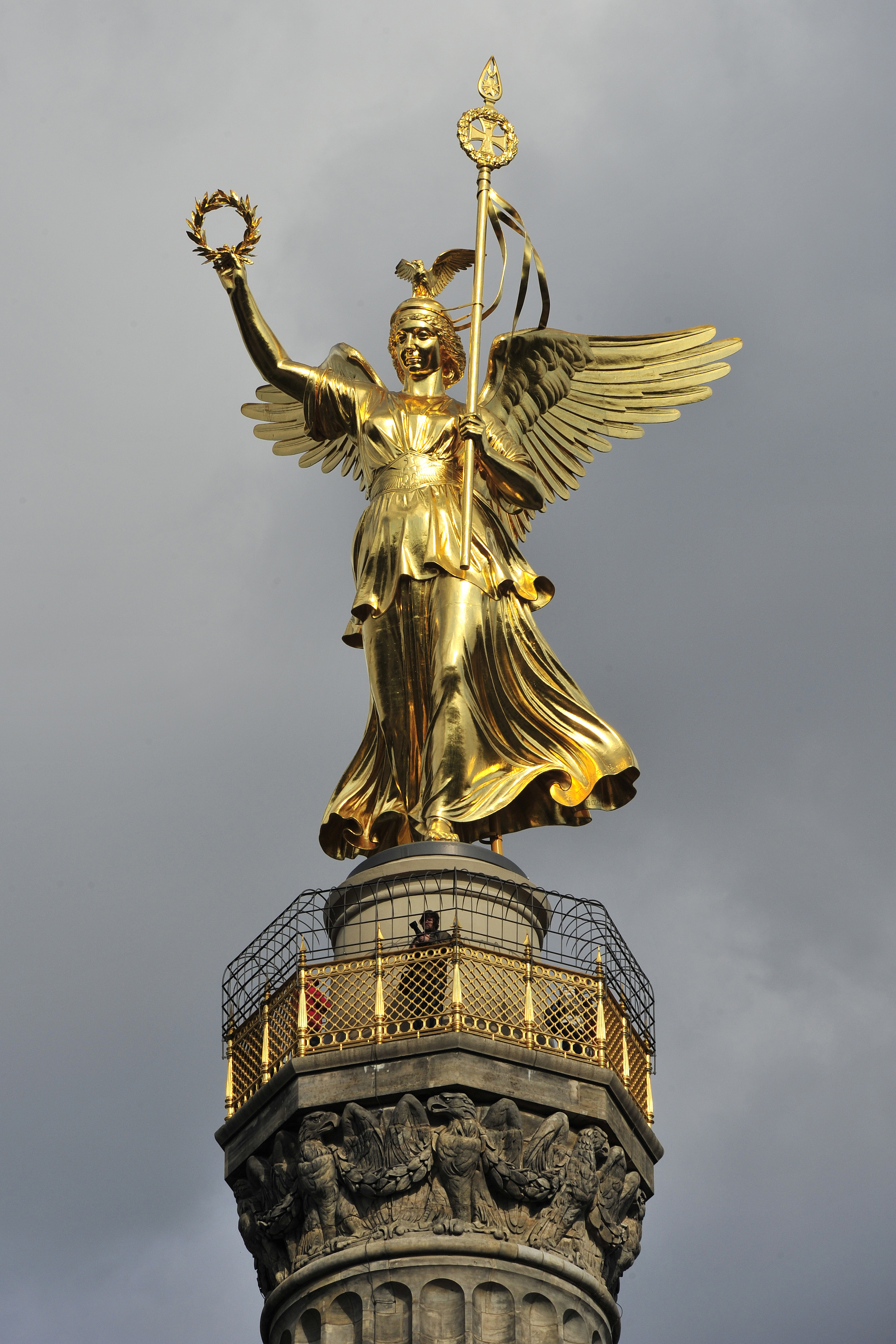
A Gladenbeck foundry casting of Victoria on top of the Berlin Victory Column

Aktien-Gesellschaft Gladenbeck was a foundry located in Berlin, Germany, that operated from 1851 until 1926. During the 75-year period when the foundry was in operation it was one of the most important foundries in Germany and was known for producing high quality bronze castings.

== History ==
The Aktien-Gesellschaft Gladenbeck foundry opened for business in 1851 in Berlin, Prussia, under the leadership of its founder, Carl Gustav Hermann Gladenbeck. It was one of the most important foundries in Germany, known for its high quality bronze castings. Some of the first bronze sculptures that emerged from the foundry were marked "Gladenbeck" with subsequent castings over the years being marked "Gladenbeck und Sohn", "Akt-Ges v.H. Gladenbeck", "Akt-Ges Gladenbeck Berlin" or "Aktien-Gesellschaft Gladenbeck".

The foundry cast many of the best known bronze sculptures created by German artists in the mid-to-late 19th century and early 20th century. In addition to serving the usually modest casting requirements of German sculptors, the foundry was also capable of casting large-scale bronze statues. In 1913 the Gladenbeck foundry cast the monumental Confederate Memorial in Arlington National Cemetery.

In 1910, Gladenbeck cast theThree Dancing Maidens Untermyer fountain by sculptor Walter Schott. The fountain is located in Conservatory Garden, Central Park, New York. The sculpture – situated on a limestone plinth – depicts three young ladies holding hands in a circle "whose dresses cling to their wet bodies as if they were perpetually in the fountain's spray". The fountain includes three jets, two on the oval pool's sides and a larger one in the center of the sculpture.

In the early 1920s, art deco master Ferdinand Preiss employed Gladenbeck to cast many of his bronze and chryselephantine sculptures.

== Foundry mark and seal ==
Aktien-Gesellschaft Gladenbeck foundry mark, c. 1902

..

== Bankruptcy ==
The foundry went out of business in 1926 when it declared bankruptcy.

== Other Gladenbeck works ==
- Statue of Alexander von Humboldt (Chicago)
- Neptunbrunnen (by Reinhold Begas)
- Victoria of the Berlin Victory Column (by Friedrich Drake)
- Oriental Water (by Ferdinand Preiss)
- Friedrich Wilhelm IV (by Alexander Calandrelli, 1886)
- The Leapfrog (by Wilhelm Haverkamp, 1891)
- Otto von Bismarck
- Princess Louise of Prussia
- Emperor Wilhelm I
- Emperor Wilhelm II

== Gallery ==
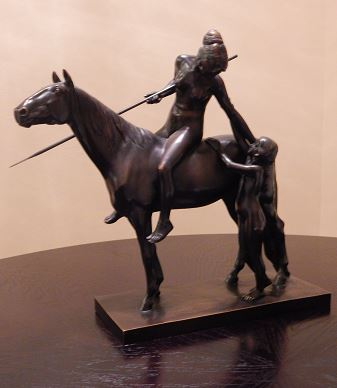
A Gladenbeck casting of Hermann Haase-Ilsenburg's "Farewell of the Amazon" (c. 1902)

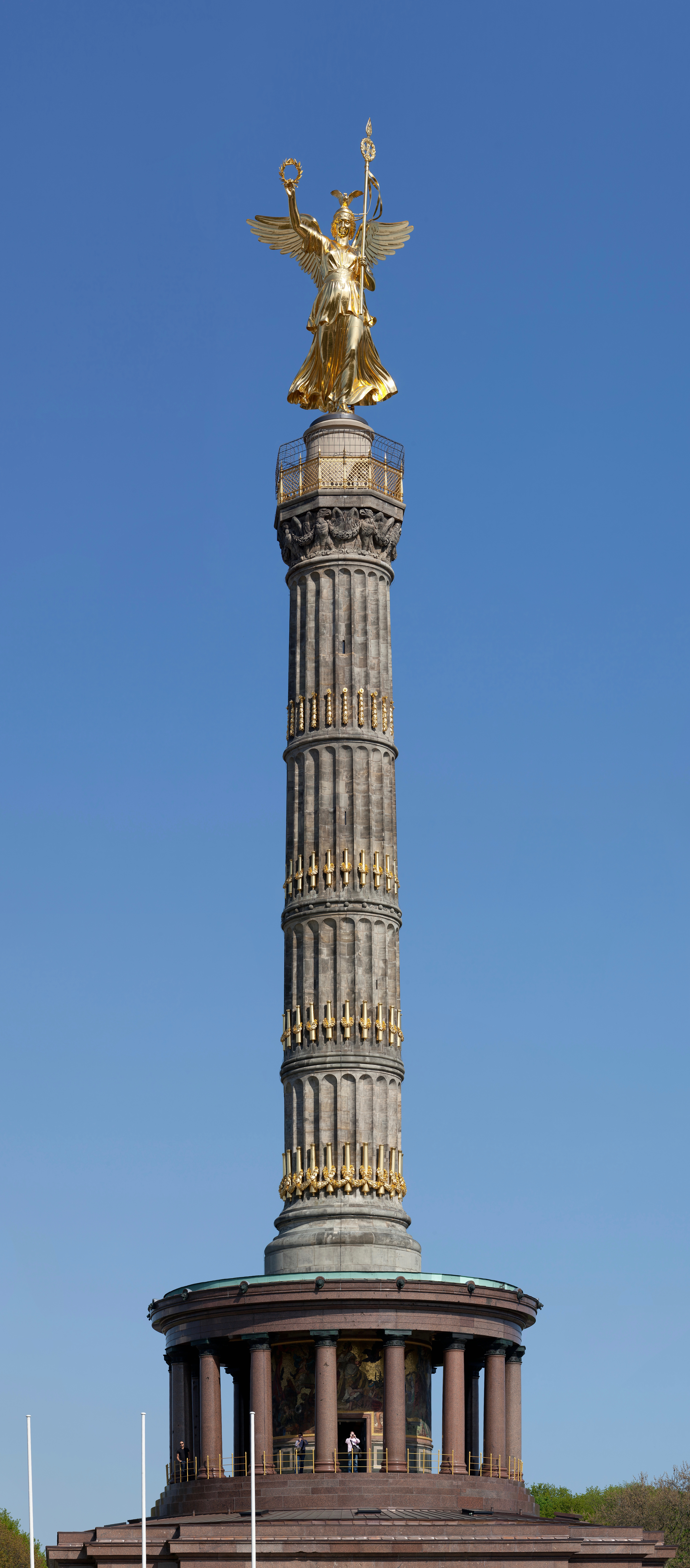
Berlin Victory Column

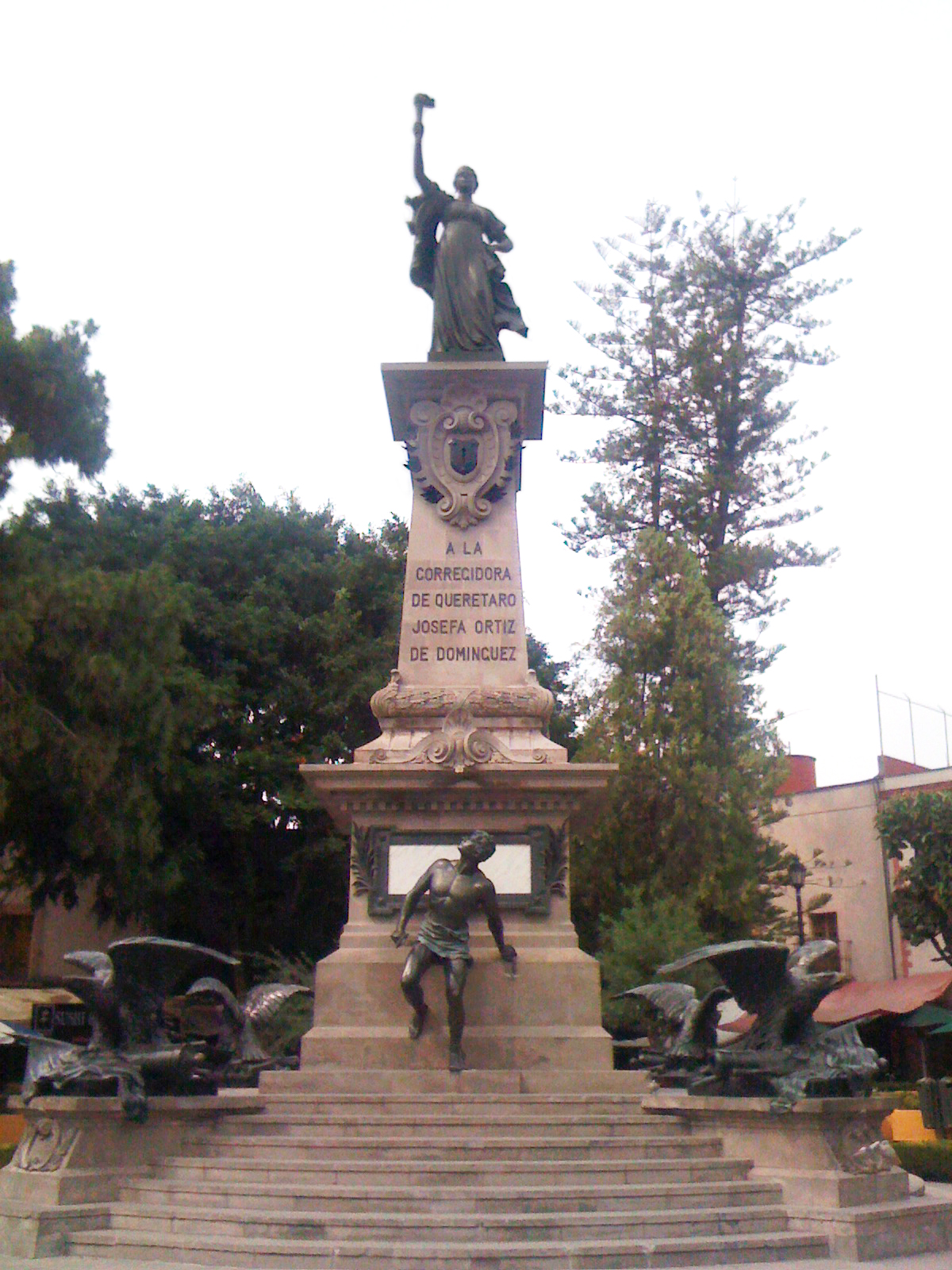
Josefa Ortiz de Dominguez Monument in Queretaro, Mexico

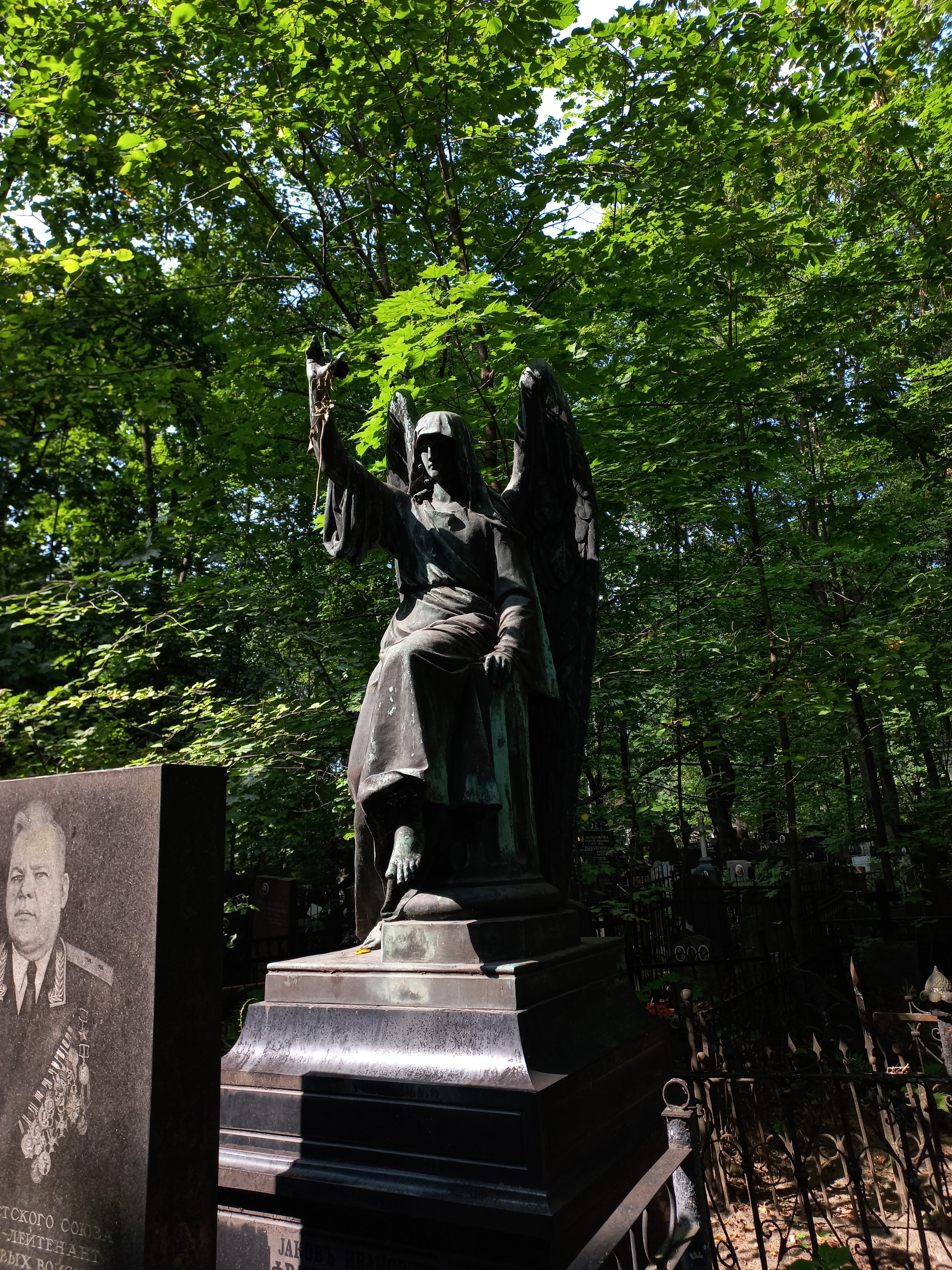
Tombstone on Vvedenskoye Cemetery, Moscow, Russia

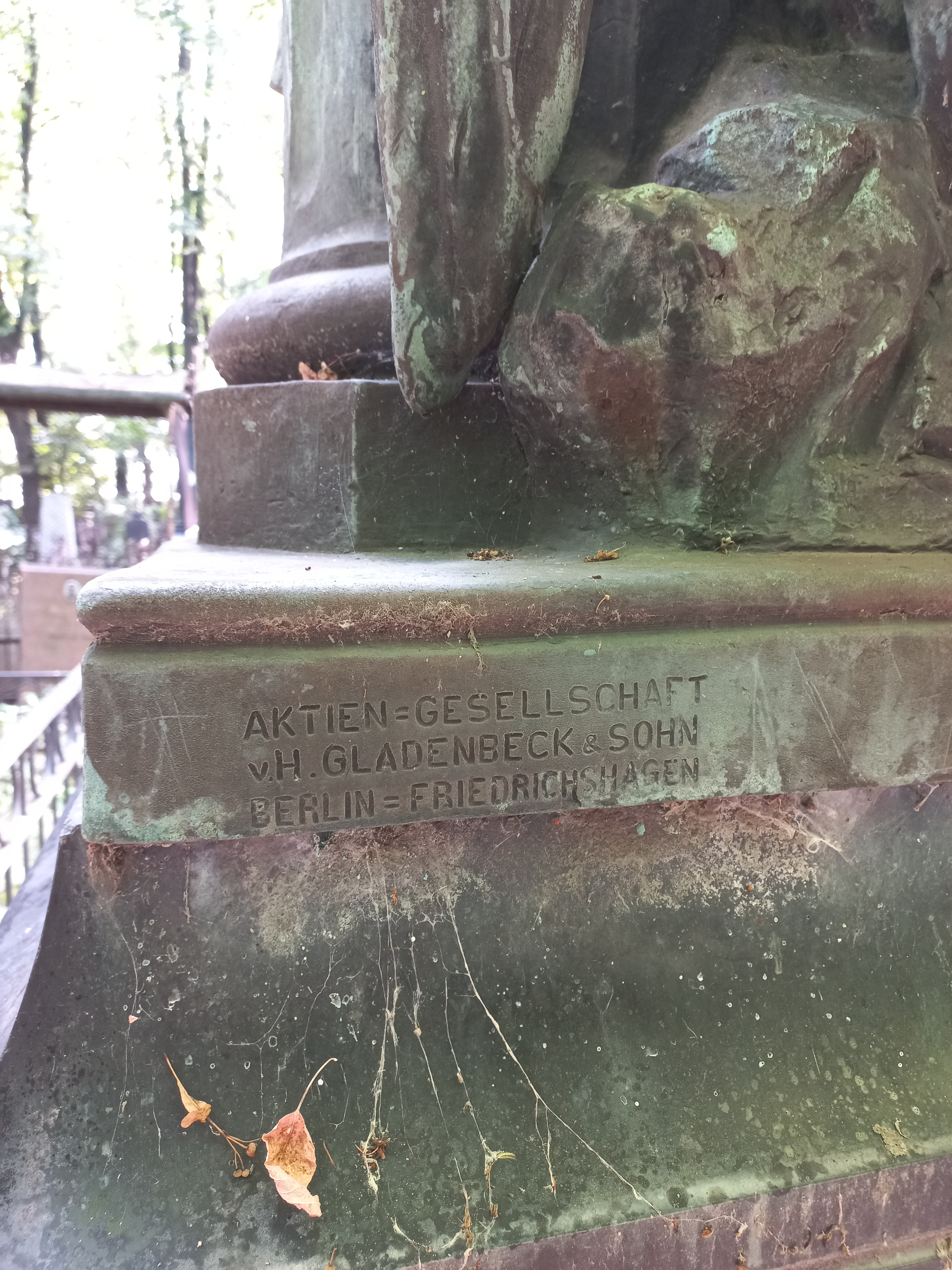
Mark on tombstone on Vvedenskoye Cemetery, Moscow, Russia

== Bibliography ==
- "Hermann Gladenbeck Bronze Sculptures". art-bronze-sculptures.com.
