= Julius Schmidt-Felling =

German sculptor

- Born: Julius Paul Schmidt-Felling; 1835; Berlin, Kingdom of Prussia
- Died: 1920 (aged 84-85); Germany (presumably)
- Known for: Sculpture
- Movement: Realism, Art Nouveau, Art Deco

Julius Paul Schmidt-Felling (1835–1920) was a German sculptor who worked during the mid-to-late 19th century and early 20th century. The subject matter of his work was wide and varied. He produced, among others, bronze statues of heroic warriors, athletes, blacksmiths, and farmers. A number of his sculptures of young children were in the Dutch colonial style, some being whimsical in nature.

== Early life ==
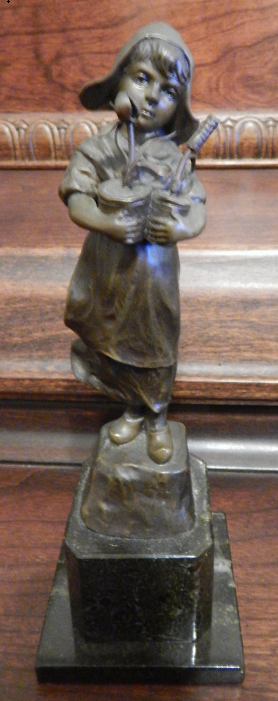
Schmidt-Felling bronze statue, cast c. 1890, of a Dutch girl holding flowers

Schmidt-Felling was born in Berlin, Kingdom of Prussia, in 1835. Little is known about his life other than the artwork he produced during an illustrious sculpting career that spanned more than 60 years.

== Career ==
His oeuvre included a wide array of sculptures, ranging in subject matter that included heroic warriors (often mounted on horseback), athletes, blacksmiths, and farmers. He sculpted a number of pieces featuring young children in primarily the Dutch colonial style. His output included some animal sculpture, too, but in lesser volume compared to other subjects. Some of his better known sculptures are small whimsical models of young boys smoking cigarettes and pipes. Schmidt-Felling was a very versatile sculptor.

The majority of Schmidt-Felling's work was cast in bronze and most pieces can be classified as being within the realism or Art Nouveau genres. Late in his career, however—during the Art Deco era—he produced a number of chryselephantine sculptures whereby both ivory and bronze were used together in the casting and construction process.

Fellow German sculptors Ferdinand Preiss and Franz Iffland were also successful with this mix of production materials during their careers. Usually, the face and hands of a statue would be carved from ivory while the remainder of the sculpture would be cast in bronze. A large number of Schmidt-Felling’s bronzes, many cast at the NBW foundry in Berlin, feature partial and full nudity. Schmidt-Felling also employed the Aktien-Gesellschaft Gladenbeck foundry for many of his bronze castings.

== Death ==
Schmidt-Felling died in 1920, presumably in Germany.

== Signature example ==
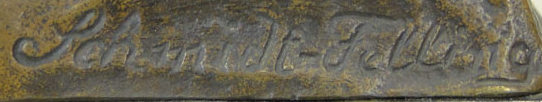
Schmidt-Felling signature example
