= Otto Schmidt-Hofer =

German sculptor

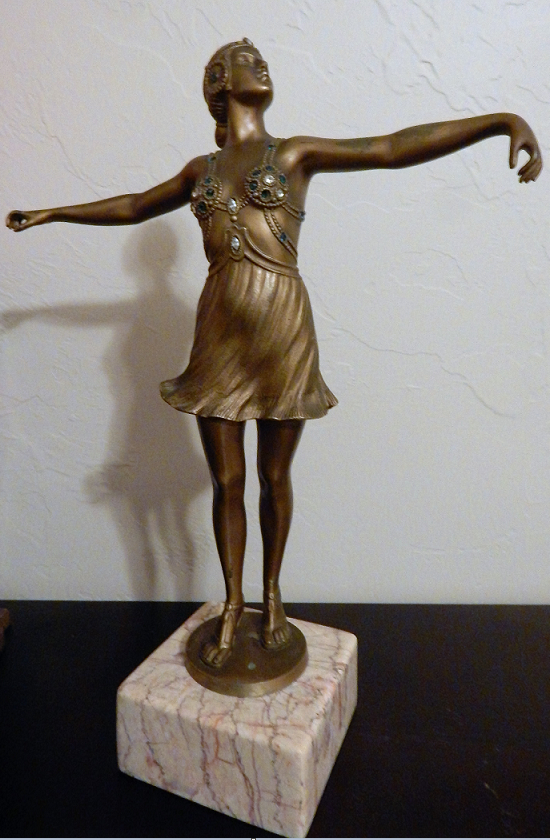
- The Entertainer, an art deco bronze sculpture by Otto Schmidt-Hofer, c. 1920
- Born: Otto Schmidt-Hofer; 1873; Berlin, German Empire
- Died: 1925 (aged 51-52); Berlin, Weimar Republic
- Known for: Sculpture
- Notable work: The Entertainer
- Movement: Neoclassical, Art Nouveau, Art Deco

Otto Schmidt-Hofer (1873–1925) was a German sculptor who worked during the late 19th century and early 20th century. His work was primarily Neoclassical and Art Nouveau between 1893-1914 and Art Deco from 1915 until his death in 1925.

== Early life and education ==
Schmidt-Hofer was born in Berlin, German Empire, in 1873. He studied at the Royal School of Art and also in the educational department at the Berlin Museum of Decorative Arts, founded as the Deutsches Gewerbe-Museum zu Berlin in 1868.

== Career ==
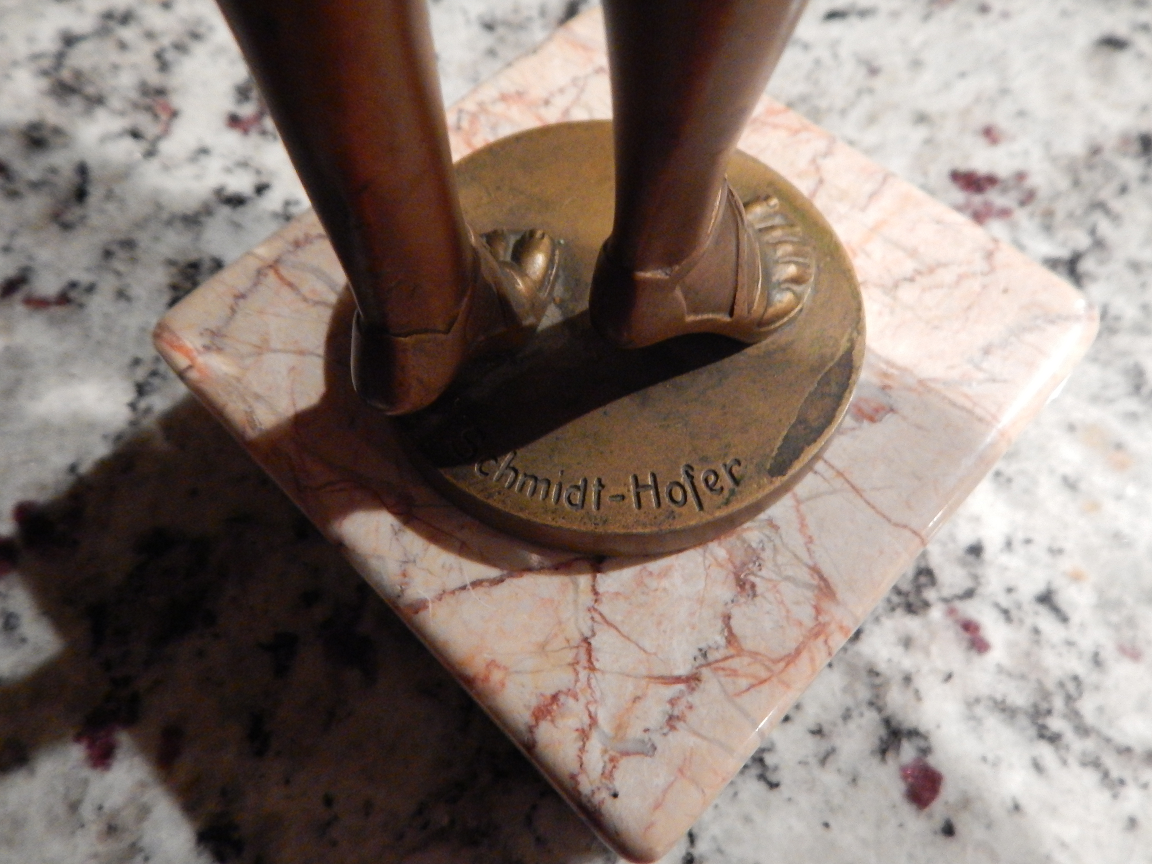
A signature example for German sculptor Otto Schmidt-Hofer from circa 1920

He specialized in genre sculpture featuring working people doing normal everyday tasks and activities. He produced a number of sculptures of blacksmiths and masons at work, women harvesting fields with scythes, and athletes.

A number of the pieces he cast were of figures in the nude which was popular during the era he worked in. Schmidt-Hofer was a member of the National Association of Artists in Germany. He produced several Neoclassical statues in patinated bronze and held membership in the Reichsverband bildender Künstler in Germany.

Schmidt-Hofer was able to transition from works produced in the Art Nouveau era and pivot to doing a number of Art Deco sculptures during the latter portion of his career between 1915 and 1925.

One sculpture, among his large career output of Art Deco sculptures, was The Entertainer. The statue, cast in four variations – one being chryselephantine and the other being all bronze (and also clothed and nude) – was among the best of the work he produced. The Entertainer features a beautiful, svelte young lady wearing a jewel-laden costume in the midst of a stage performance. Schmidt-Hofer also produced a small version of the statue (about 6 inches high) that was mounted on a Brazilian green onyx pin dish. The full array of Schmidt-Hofer's plentiful sculpting skills are displayed in this artwork which he completed c. 1920.

== Death and legacy ==
Schmidt-Hofer died in Berlin, Weimar Republic, in 1925. Along with other German sculptors of the period such as Iffland, Preiss, and Schmidt-Felling, Schmidt-Hofer takes his rightful place as one of the premier Neoclassical, Art Deco, and Art Nouveau sculptors that Germany has ever produced.
