= Iffland =

Iffland is a surname. Notable people with the name include:

- August Wilhelm Iffland (1759–1814), German actor and dramatic author
- Franz Iffland (1862–1935), German sculptor and painter
- Rhiannan Iffland (born 1991), Australian athlete

See also

- Iffland-Ring, German award
