= Conservatory Garden =

Garden in New York City's Central Park

Coordinates: 40.7938°N 73.9523°W

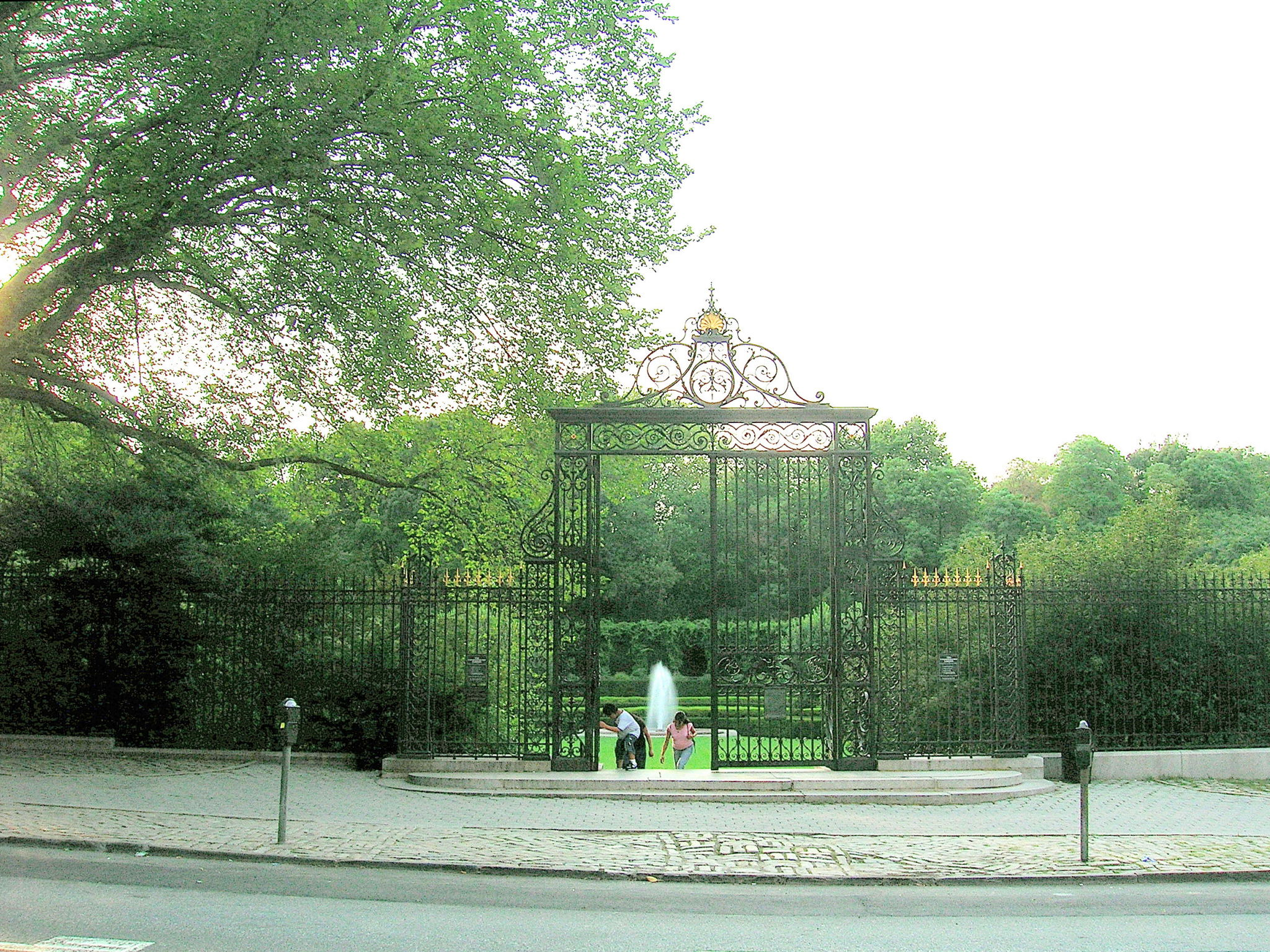
The Vanderbilt Gate leads to the formal central section.

Notable buildings and structures of Central Park. Click on the map and then on the points for details.
'"`UNIQ--templatestyles-00000000-QINU`"''"`UNIQ--templatestyles-00000001-QINU`"'

The Conservatory Garden is a formal garden near the northeastern corner of Central Park in Upper Manhattan, New York City. Comprising 6 acres (24,000 m^{2}), it is the only formal garden in Central Park. Conservatory Garden takes its name from a conservatory that stood on the site from 1898 to 1935. It is located just west of Fifth Avenue, opposite 104th to 106th Streets.

== History ==
The park's first head gardener, Ignatz Anton Pilát, stored plants at the site of Conservatory Garden during the construction of Central Park. At the time, park architects Frederick Law Olmsted and Calvert Vaux wanted to landscape most of the northeast corner of Central Park as part of an arboretum, including the site of the current Conservatory Garden and Harlem Meer. However, this proposal was not implemented because of a lack of funds. Additionally, a formal conservatory had been planned for Conservatory Water, further south in Central Park, but was never built.

A greenhouse on the site of Conservatory Garden was erected in 1898, and it contained exhibitions of plants and flower beds. Later, the glasshouses at the site were used to harden hardwood cuttings for the park's plantings.

In 1935, NYC Parks commissioner Robert Moses destroyed the greenhouse which he believed to be obsolete. Moses engaged landscape architect Gilmore D. Clarke, to prepare designs for a new garden, including planting plans prepared by his wife, M. Betty Sprout. (Note: M. Betty Sprout, ASLA, (1906–1962), an accomplished landscape architect in her own right, was also Mrs Gilmore D. Clarke (National Register of Historic Places registration for Parkfairfax, Alexandria, Virginia), a Colonial Revival low-density housing development of 1941–43, by Leonard Schultze and Associates, architects, with a site plan developed by Gilmore Clarke, with planting plans by M. Betty Sprout.) WPA workers built and planted the garden, which opened to the public in 1937.

By the 1970s, the garden had become a wasteland. In the late 1980s, it was restored and partially replanted under the direction of horticulturist and urban landscape designer Lynden Miller and reopened in June 1987. The overgrown, top-heavy crabapples were freed of watershoots and pruned up to a higher scaffold for better form. The high-style mixed planting was the first to bring estate garden style to urban parks, part of the general renewal of Central Park under Elizabeth Barlow Rogers of the Central Park Conservancy.

The Conservatory Garden underwent another renovation in the 2020s at a cost of $17 million. After work on the South Garden was completed in early 2023, the Central Park Conservancy renovated the North Garden and Italianate Center Garden. As of 2023, the project was planned to be complete by early 2025; it was ultimately finished by that June. The project had cost $25 million.

== Sections ==
The garden is composed of three distinct parts, skillfully restored since the 1980s. It is accessible through the Vanderbilt Gate at Fifth Avenue and 105th Street, a quarter mile (400 m) south of the park's northeast corner, as well as other points within the park. The Vanderbilt Gate once gave access to the forecourt of Cornelius Vanderbilt II House, the grandest of the Fifth Avenue mansions of the Gilded Age, at 58th Street and Fifth Avenue, sharing the Plaza with the Plaza Hotel. The wrought iron gates with cast iron and repoussé details, were designed by Post and executed in an iron foundry in Paris.

Below the steps flanked by Cornelian cherry (Cornus mas), the central section of the Conservatory Garden is a symmetrical lawn outlined in clipped yew, (Note: Designated "French" or "Italian" equally by journalists; in autumn 2006 the yews were replanted with more naturally spreading Taxus media ‘Hatfieldii' cultivars that will make low formal shaping easier to maintain.) with a single central fountain jet at the rear. It is flanked by twin allées of crabapples and backed by a curved wisteria pergola against the steep natural slope, that is dominated at its skyline by a giant American Sycamore. Otherwise there is no flower color: instead, on any fine Saturday afternoon in June, it is the scene of photography sessions for colorful wedding parties, for which limousines pull up in rows on Fifth Avenue.

To the left on the south side, is the garden of mixed herbaceous borders in wide concentric bands around The Secret Garden water lily pool, dedicated in 1936 to the memory of Frances Hodgson Burnett, with sculpture by Bessie Potter Vonnoh. Some large shrubs, like tree lilac, magnolias, buddleias and Cornus alba 'elegantissima' provide vertical structure and offer light shade to offset the sunny locations, planted by Lynden Miller with a wide range of hardy perennials and decorative grasses, intermixed with annuals planted to seem naturalized. This garden has seasonal features to draw visitors from April through October.

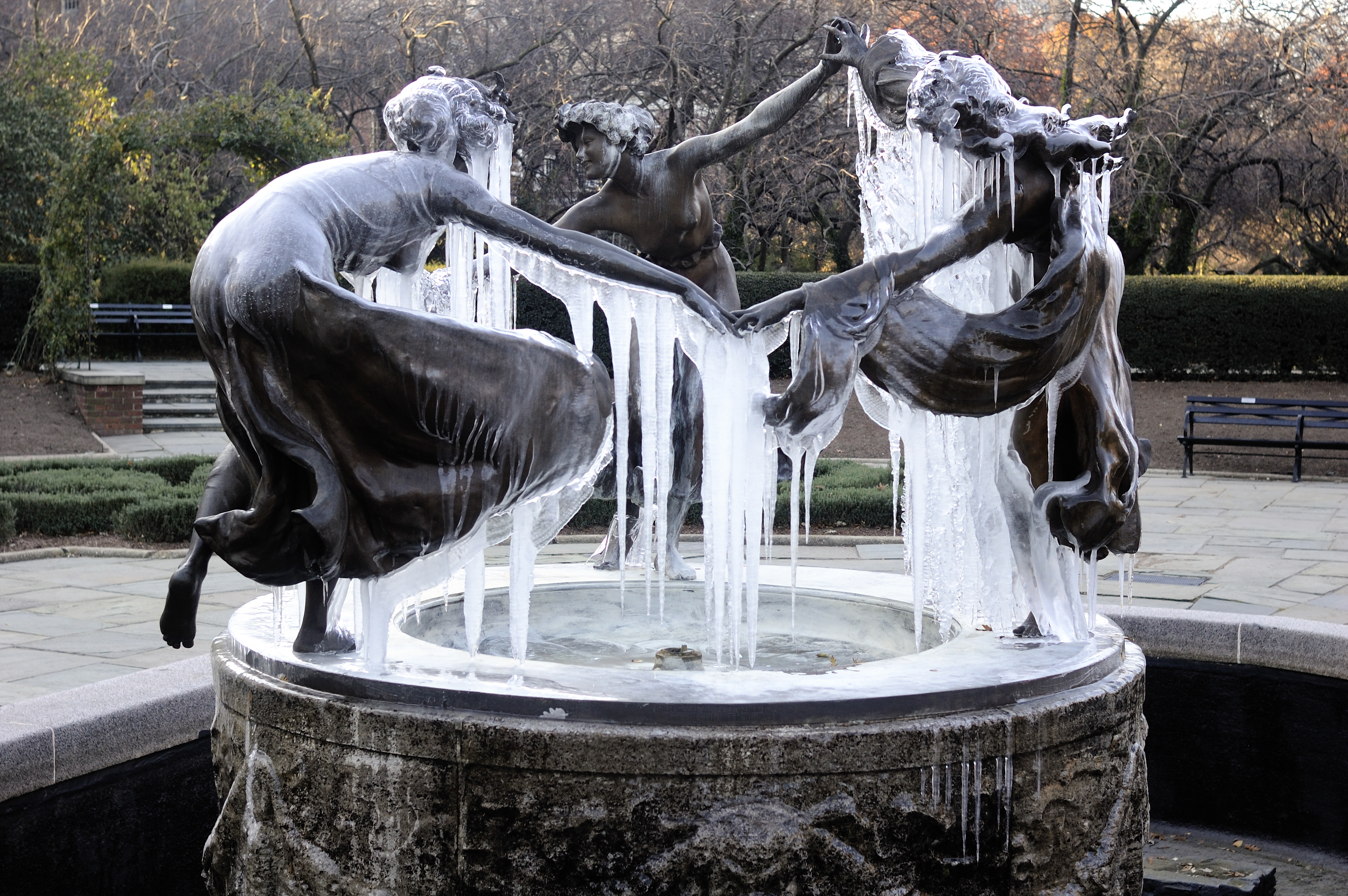
Untermyer Fountain with Three Dancing Maidens by Walter Schott

To the right of the central formal plat is a garden also in concentric circles, round the Untermyer Fountain, which was donated by the family of Samuel Untermyer in 1947. The bronze figures, Three Dancing Maidens by Walter Schott (1861–1938), were executed in Germany about 1910 and formed a fountain at Untermyer's estate "Greystone" in Yonkers, New York.

This section of the Conservatory Garden has two dramatic seasons of massed display, of tulips in the spring and Korean chrysanthemums in the fall. Beds of santolina clipped in knotted designs with contrasting bronze-leaved bedding begonias surround the fountain, and four rose arbor gates are planted with reblooming 'Silver Moon' and 'Betty Prior' roses.
