= Untermyer Fountain =

Fountain in Central Park, Manhattan, New York, U.S.

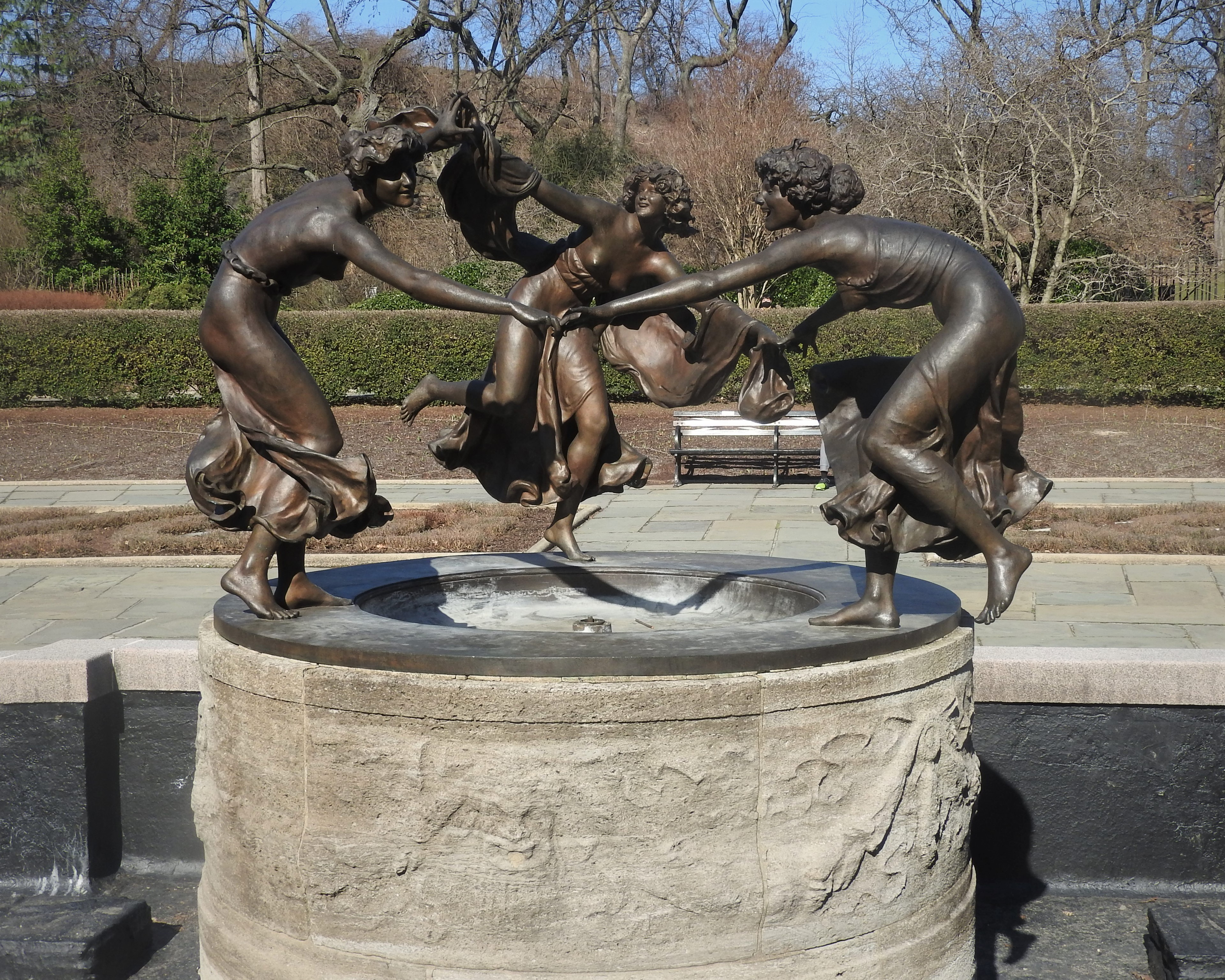
- Fountain and sculpture in 2020
- Artist: Walter Schott
- Type: Fountain; sculpture
- Medium: Bronze; limestone
- Location: New York City; 40.79426°N 73.95195°W

The Untermyer Fountain is a memorial fountain with a bronze cast of Walter Schott's sculpture Three Dancing Maidens. It is located in the Conservatory Garden of Central Park in New York City.

== Description and history ==
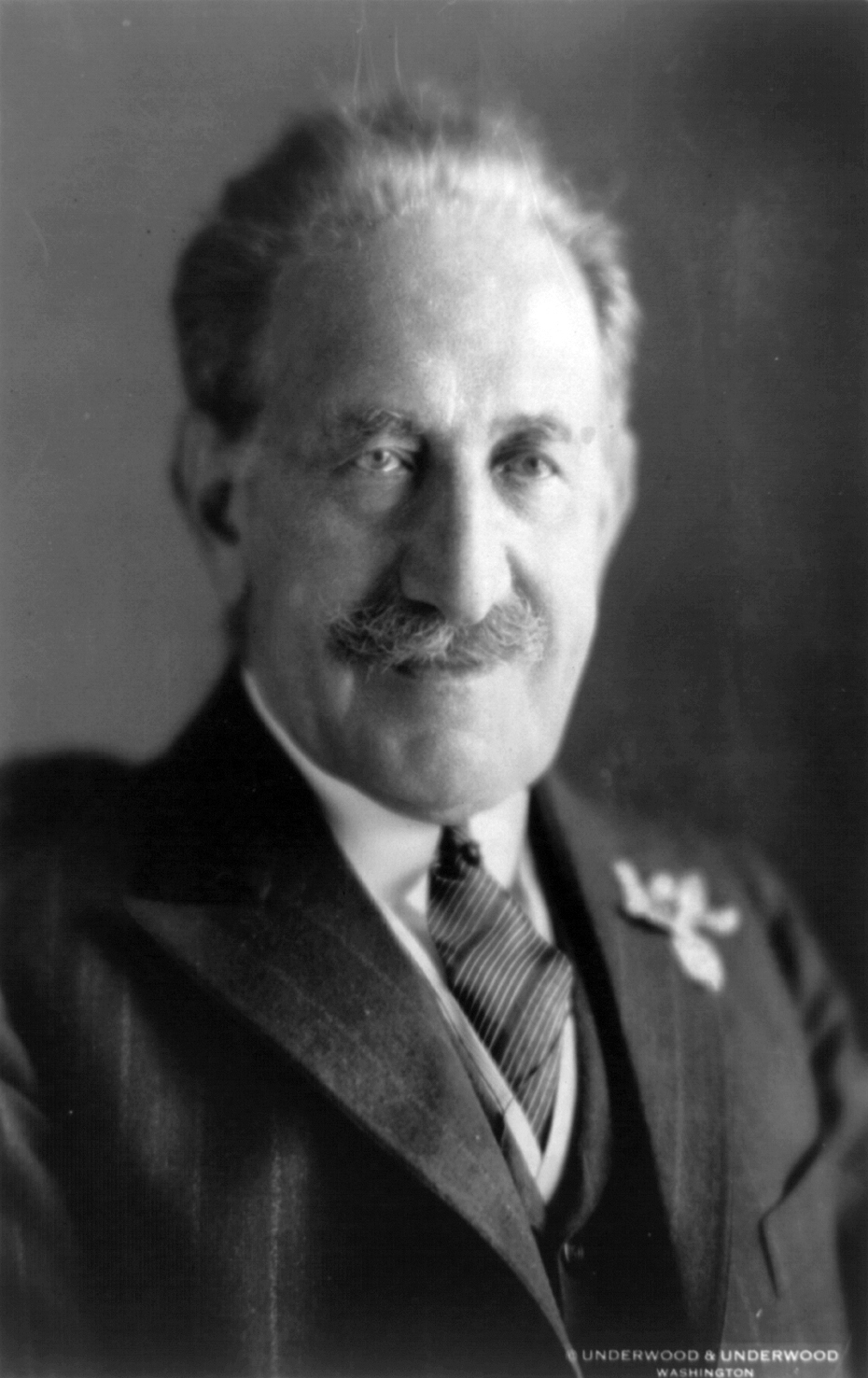
Samuel Untermyer in 1932

The Untermyer Fountain features a bronze cast of Walter Schott's Three Dancing Maidens, completed in Germany prior to 1910. Named after American lawyer and civic leader Samuel Untermyer, the fountain was donated to the park by his children, Irwin Untermyer, Alvin Untermyer, and Irene Richter, following his death in 1940.

Originally, the sculpture was located at his estate "Greystone" in Yonkers, New York, part of which is now owned by the City of Yonkers and known as Untermyer Park. The fountain was installed in Central Park in 1947 and is most easily accessed from the North Garden entrance at 106th Street and Fifth Avenue or the main entrance at 105th Street and Fifth Avenue.

Three Dancing Maidens depicts three young women, holding hands in a circle, "whose dresses cling to their wet bodies as if they were perpetually in the fountain's spray". The fountain includes three jets: two on the oval pool's sides and a larger one in the center of the sculpture. The sculpture sits on a limestone base.

== Reception ==
The fountain has been included in guidebooks and walking tours of Central Park.
