= Three Dancing Maidens =

Sculpture by Walter Schott

- Artist: Walter Schott
- Year: 1909 (116 years ago)
- Medium: Bronze sculpture
- Location: Mecklenburg, Germany; New York City, United States; Antwerp, Belgium

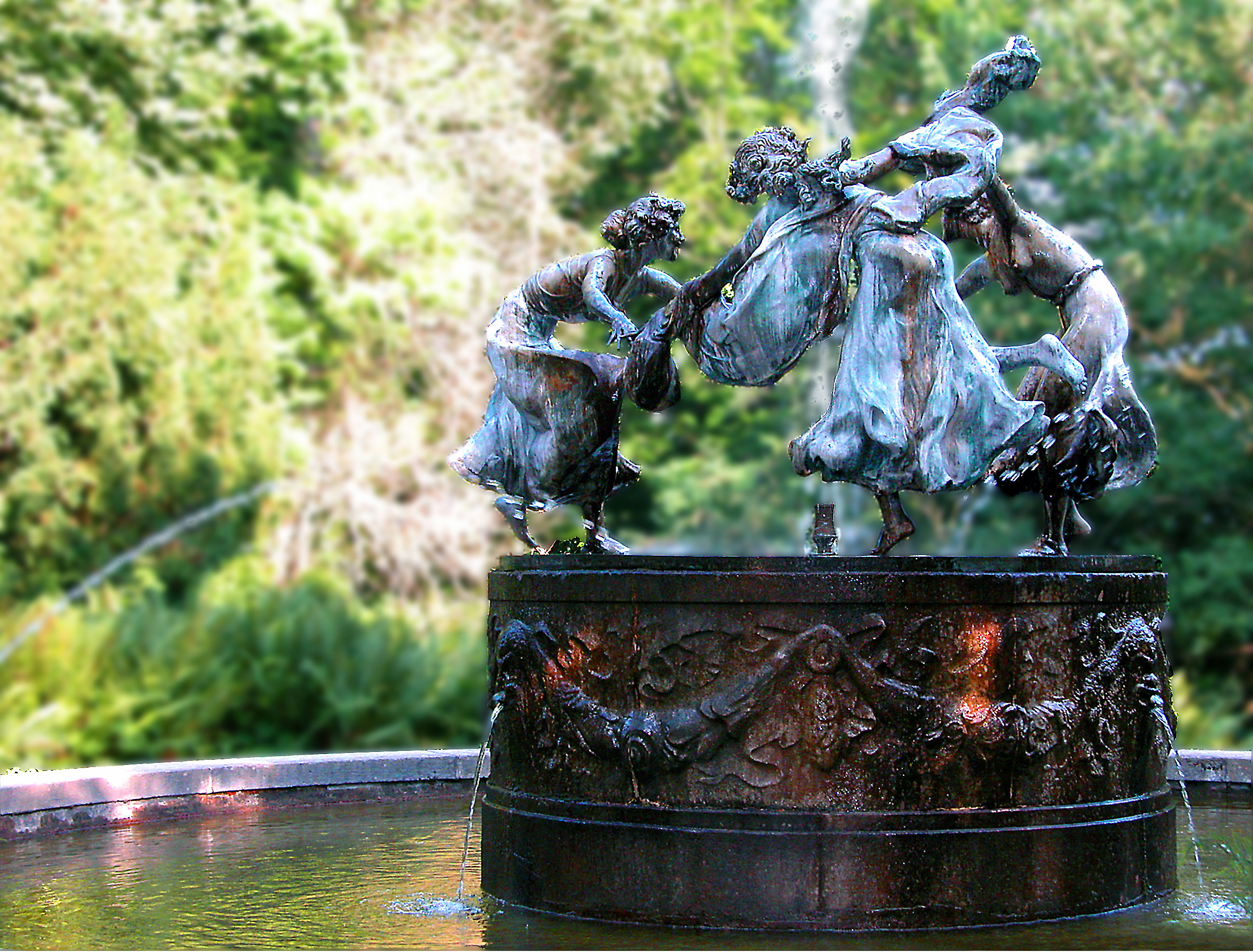
The sculpture in the courtyard of the Burg Schlitz Hotel, Germany

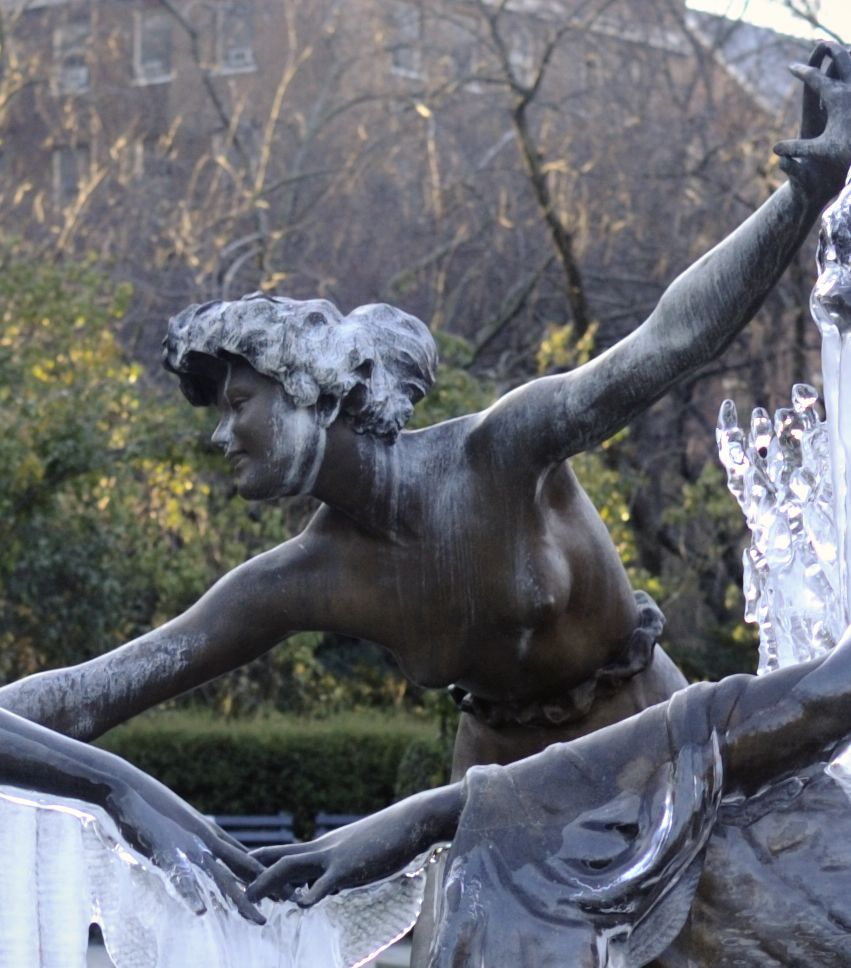
Close-up of one of the maidens

Three Dancing Maidens (German: Drei tanzende Mädchen) is a nymph fountain (Nymphenbrunnen) sculpture by Walter Schott. There are three full-size versions or castings of the bronze sculpture. One is known as the Untermyer Fountain in Central Park in New York City, the second is in Antwerp’s Den Brandt Park, and the third is in the courtyard of the Burg Schlitz Hotel, a grand hotel in the Mecklenburg region of northern Germany. Identification of the original sculpture created for Rudolf Mosse in 1909, and later looted by the Nazi Party is the subject of research, which appears to be leading to the version in the Burg Schlitz castle. Three-quarter-scale castings, likely to be examples of the sculptor's early drafts, can be found in Germany, Austria, and Northern California.

== Description ==
The bronze sculpture features three life-size young women dancing in a circle, their dresses wet and clinging to their bodies. The girls have their fingers intertwined and gleeful expressions on their faces. Dianne Durante, author of Outdoor Monuments of Manhattan, wrote that "it radiates delight, in a way few sculptures match, and there isn’t any point of view that doesn’t reveal some new, graceful aspect".

== History ==
=== Creation ===
Schott began the creation of Three Dancing Maidens towards the end of the 19th century, using girls from the local Berlin area as models. After numerous sketches, he made a model at a three-quarter-scale followed by 36 more attempts. Despite all the work, he was unhappy with the project until he met Rudolf Mosse. Mosse, a wealthy and influential newspaper magnate in Berlin, spoke with Schott about his desire to have a fountain on the grounds of his residence on Leipziger Platz. The Mosse Palais was already home to a large collection of art and Mosse hoped to have a decorative fountain placed in the courtyard. The conversation inspired Schott who, as a perfectionist, worked on the design for several more years. The piece was finally installed in the early 1900s.

There are three known full-size castings of the finished sculpture and several three-quarter-scale castings have also been found. Two additional full-size copies were cast in 2003.

=== Ownership ===
When Rudolf Mosse died in 1920 his estate passed onto his daughter Felicia and her husband Hans Lachmann-Mosse, including the newspaper Berliner Tageblatt. The rise to power of the Nazi Party meant that a Jewish-run media empire was not viewed favourably. In 1933, Nazi officer Wilhelm Ohst arrived at the Mosse Palais and announced the imminent auction of all the artwork, including the fountain. The family fled, and the building was turned into Hans Frank's Academy for German Law. A photograph taken in 1940 shows the courtyard with a stone lion replacing Schott's sculpture.

Many pieces of art stolen by the Nazi Party have been returned to their original owners, while others have been lost. Wally Mersereau, a wealthy investor from Northern California, enjoyed spending time as an amateur researcher. Around the early 2010s, Mersereau visited New York City, and a walk in the Conservatory Garden in Central Park drew his attention to the Untermyer Fountain. (40°47′39.4″N 73°57′7.0″W) The plaque showed that the fountain was dedicated to Samuel Untermyer and his wife Minnie. With help from translated excerpts from Schott's memoirs Mersereau was able to track down six versions of Three Dancing Maidens including the original, two full-size casts, and three three-quarters scale versions, plus two more recent full-size reproductions. The Untermyer Fountain is one of the full size casts which was donated to the park by the children of Samuel Untermyer in 1947, having originally stood at his Greystone estate in Yonkers, New York. Mersereau made it his personal mission to find every copy of the sculpture that existed, travelling the globe to view each one. He found two other full-size versions: one in Den Brandt Park, Antwerp, (51°10′59.3″N 4°24′22.9″E) and the other in the courtyard of the Burg Schlitz, a hotel in Mecklenburg, Germany. (53°42′1.5″N 12°32′27.5″E) The one in Germany is believed to be the original but provenance is disputed. If investigations found which one was the original it may have to be returned to the Mosse family estate. The plinth on which the sculpture stands may also be the original but testing it requires permission of the owner, something he has not been keen to do.

There are currently three of the three-quarters size versions known from the 36 originally cast. One is in the rear garden of the Stauss Villa in Berlin-Dahlem. Another, known as the Wurlitzer Fountain, can be found in a park in Burlingame, California; and another in a private park in the Austrian Alps.

In 2003 two additional full-size copies were cast from molds taken from the Burg Schlitz version. One is on the grounds of Gondelsheim Castle in southwestern Germany, and the other is outside the E.ON administration building in Potsdam.

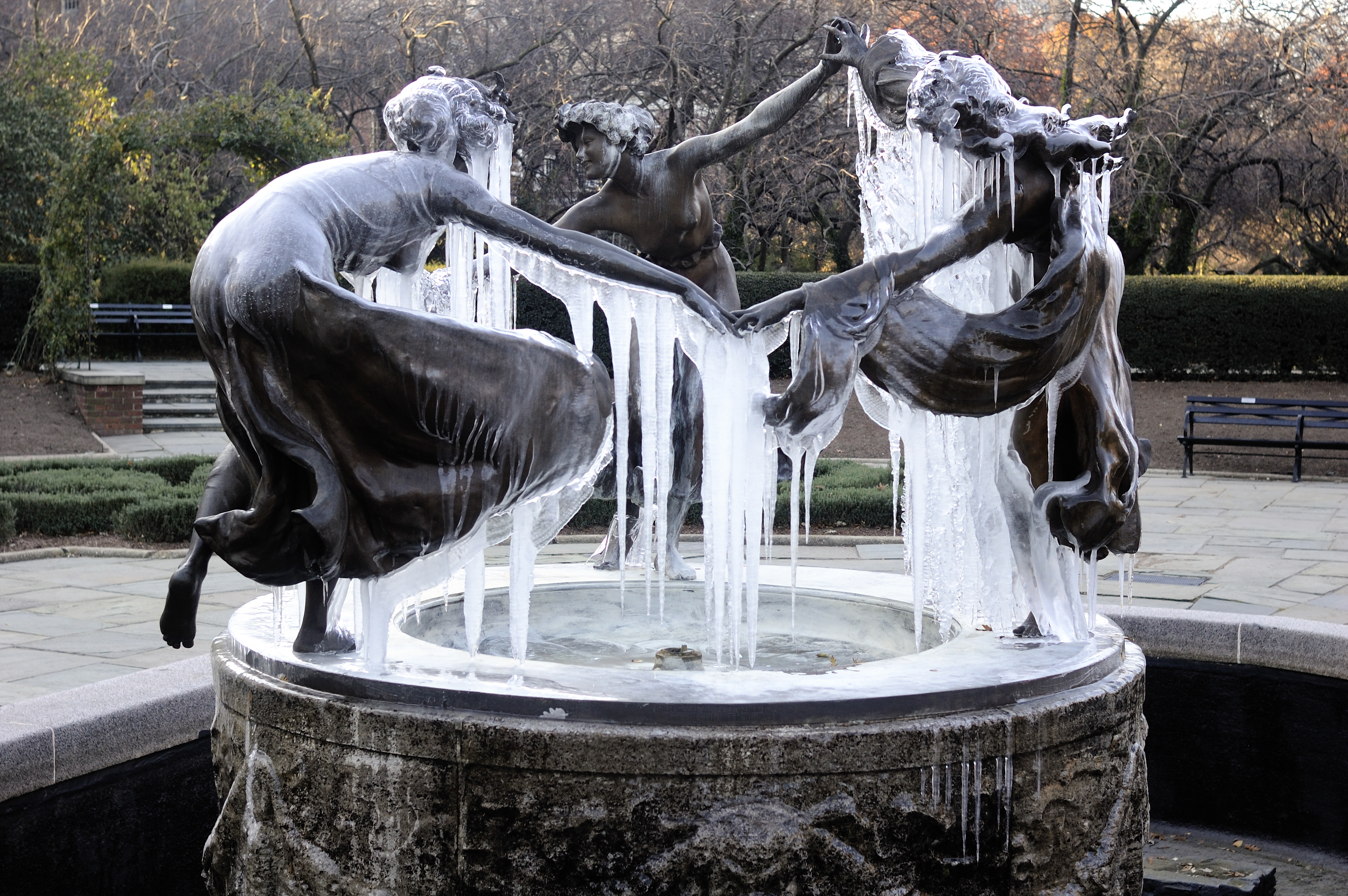
The Untermyer Fountain in New York.

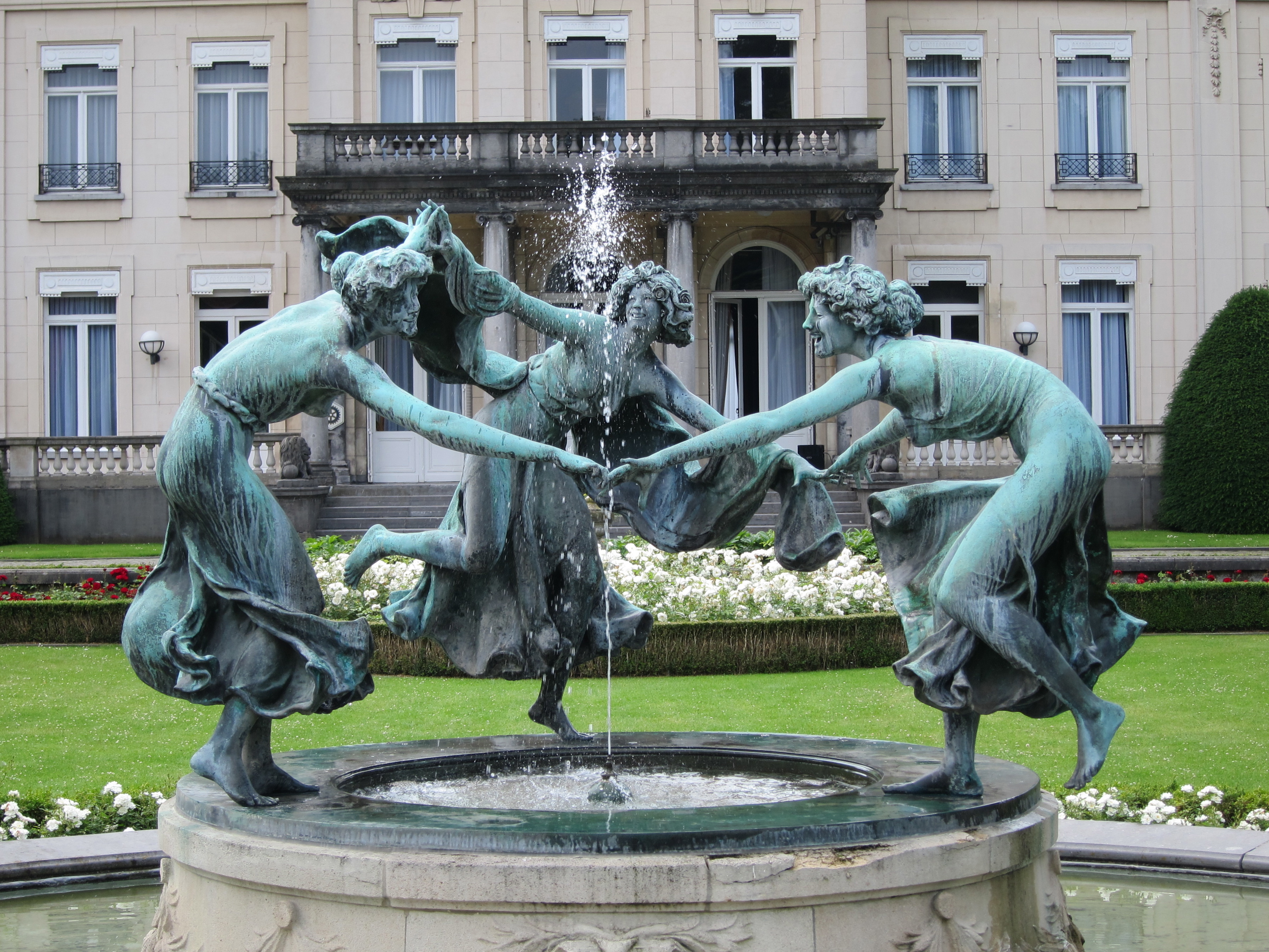
The fountain in Den Brandt Park, Antwerp.

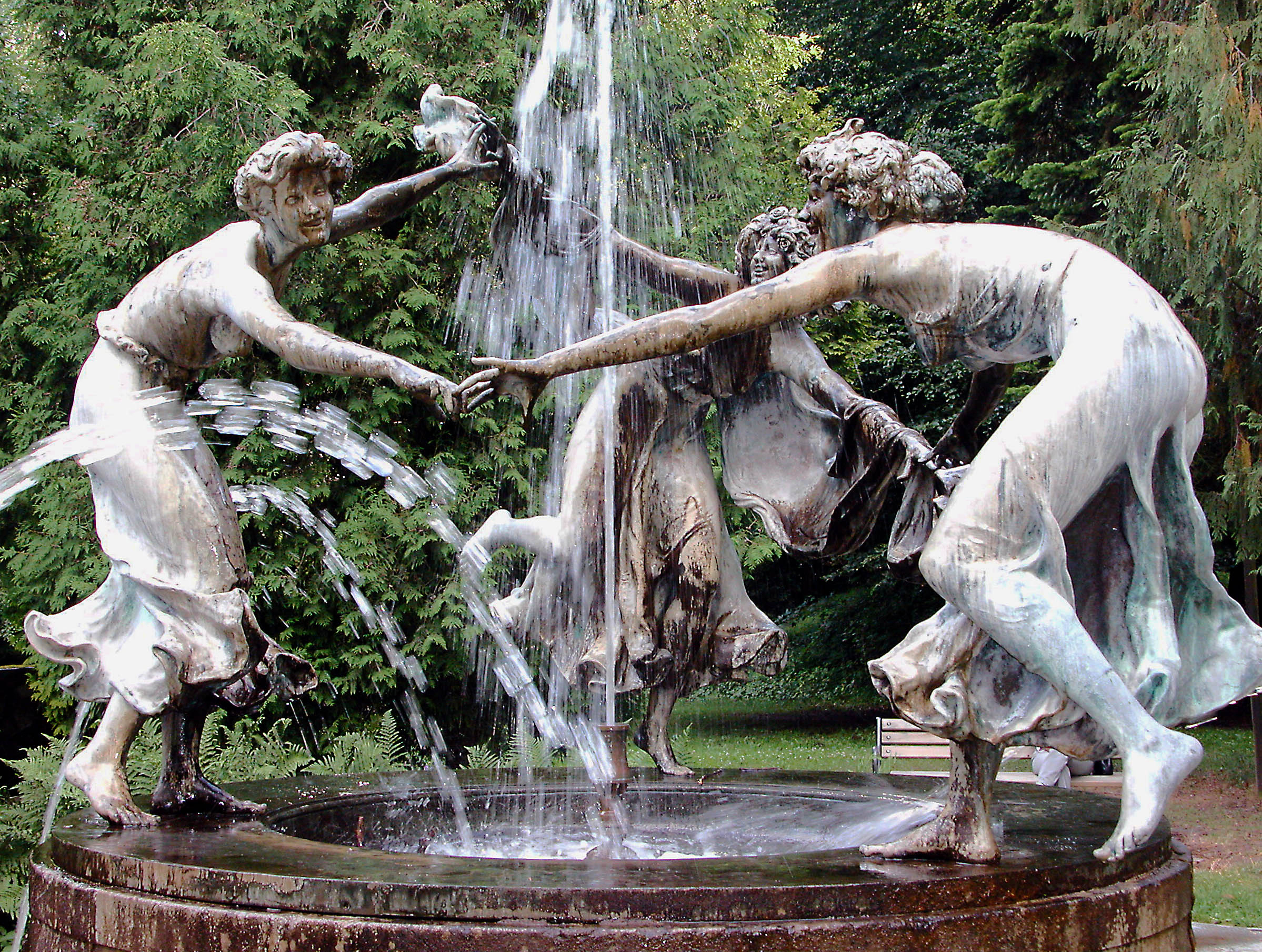
The fountain at the Burg Schlitz.

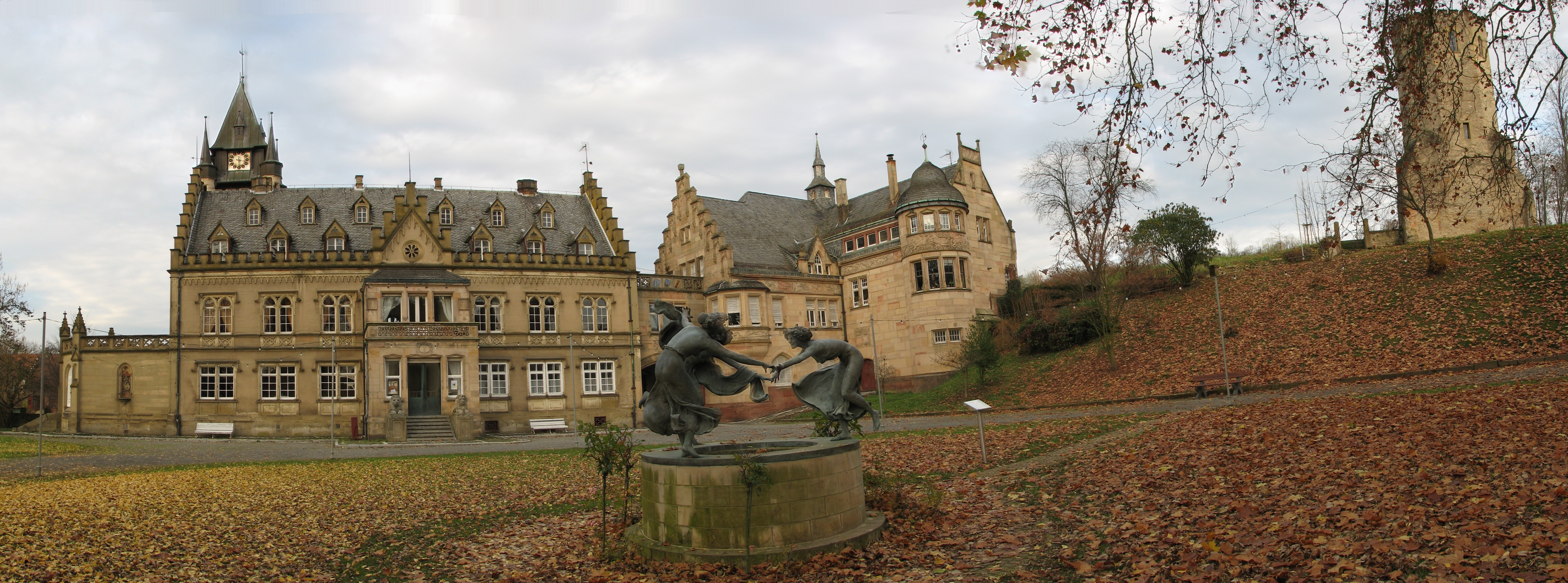
A copy at Gondelsheim Castle.
