= Ferdinand Preiss =

German sculptor

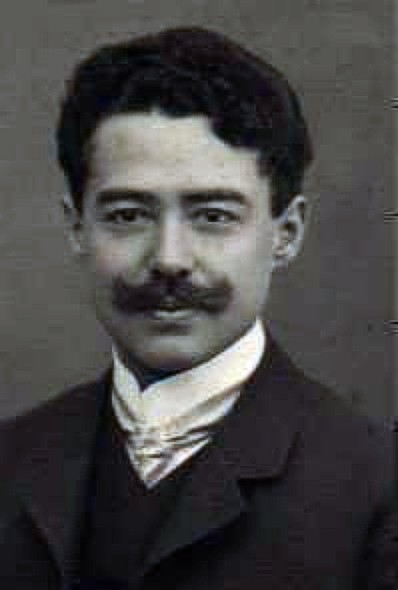
- Preiss, c. 1912
- Born: 13 February 1882; Erbach, German Empire
- Died: 29 July 1943 (aged 61); Berlin, Nazi Germany
- Known for: Sculpture
- Notable work: Con Brio; Flame Leaper; Balancing; Queen Elizabeth
- Movement: Art Deco

Johann Philipp Ferdinand Preiss (13 February 1882 – 29 July 1943) was a German sculptor. He was one of the leading sculptors of the Art Deco period.

== Early life ==
Ferdinand Preiss was born in Erbach im Odenwald as one of six children to Karl Daniel Heinrich Preiss and his wife Katharine Preiss née Elisabetham. He attended school s in Michelstadt and had aspirations to become an engineer. Both of his parents died within a short time span when he was 15 and shortly thereafter he was apprenticed to the ivory carver Philipp Willmann and lived with his family. In 1901 he traveled to Rome and Paris. He became a friend and acquaintance of Arthur Kassler in Baden-Baden, which led to the founding of the company Preiss & Kassler operating from Berlin. Kassler became the business-minded partner and Preiss controlled artistic production.

== Career and marriage ==
In 1907 he married Margarethe Hilme, producing two children, Harry and Lucie.

Initially his company, Preiss and Kassler, created small ivory carvings of children and statuettes of classical form, often carved from old ivory billiard balls. From 1910 the firm grew to specialize in limited edition Art Deco cabinet sculptures that used painted bronze with ivory on plinths of onyx and marble, with an occasional foray into mantelpiece clocks and lampstands. He revolutionized the production of chryselephantine statues with his use of a dental drill for more precise and expeditious carving of the ivory. Preiss designed nearly all the firm's models and many of his most famous works depict modern, naturalistic 20th-century women from the sports and theatrical world.

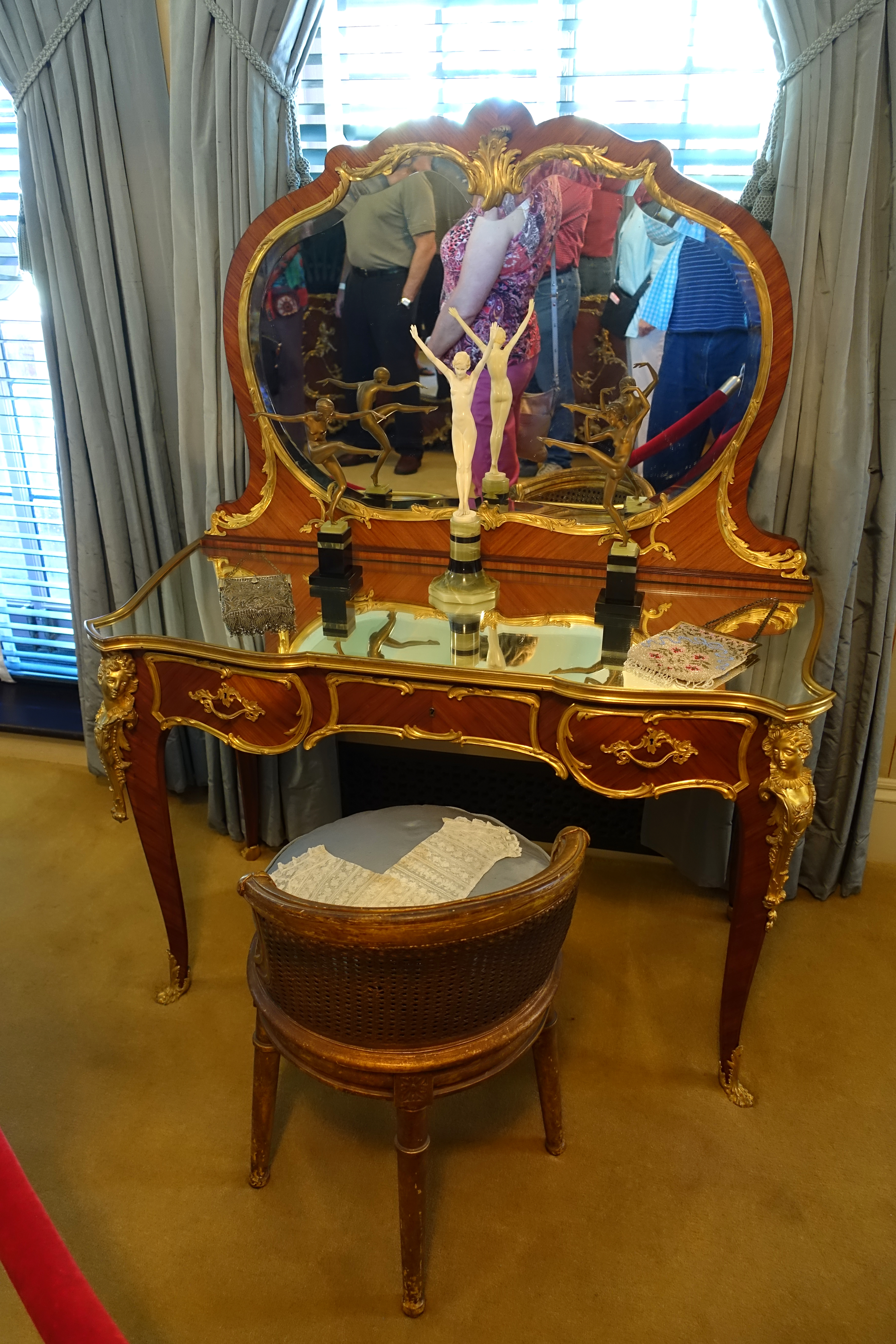
Vanity with Young Woman by Johann Philipp Ferdinand Preiss, 1900s, ivory, onyx, green marble

Casting of the pieces was initially done by the Aktien-Gesellschaft Gladenbeck foundry in Berlin and later by their own Preiss & Kassler foundry. With the outbreak of World War I in 1914 the company was employing six extremely skilled ivory carvers from Erbach and exporting regularly to England and the United States. A small factory was set up in England to assemble the sculptures from parts manufactured in Germany which also avoided taxes on imports.

Ferdinand Preiss has sometimes been incorrectly called Fritz Preiss. His works, along with those of Demetre H. Chiparus, are regarded as the pinnacle of Art Deco sculpture and are greatly valued by modern collectors.

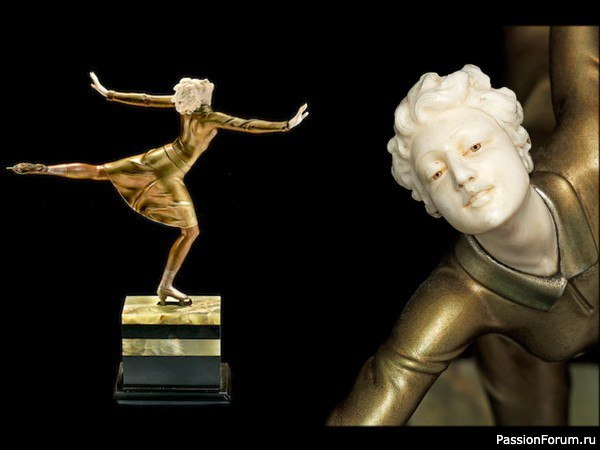
The statue of Frederick Priess

== Death and legacy ==
The firm closed with Preiss's death from a brain tumor on 29 July 1943. The old workshop in Ritterstraße in Berlin, which was housing the stock of samples, was gutted by a fire resulting from a bomb attack shortly before the end of World War II. Preiss is remembered as one of the greatest sculptors of the Art Deco era.
