= Walter Schott =

German sculptor

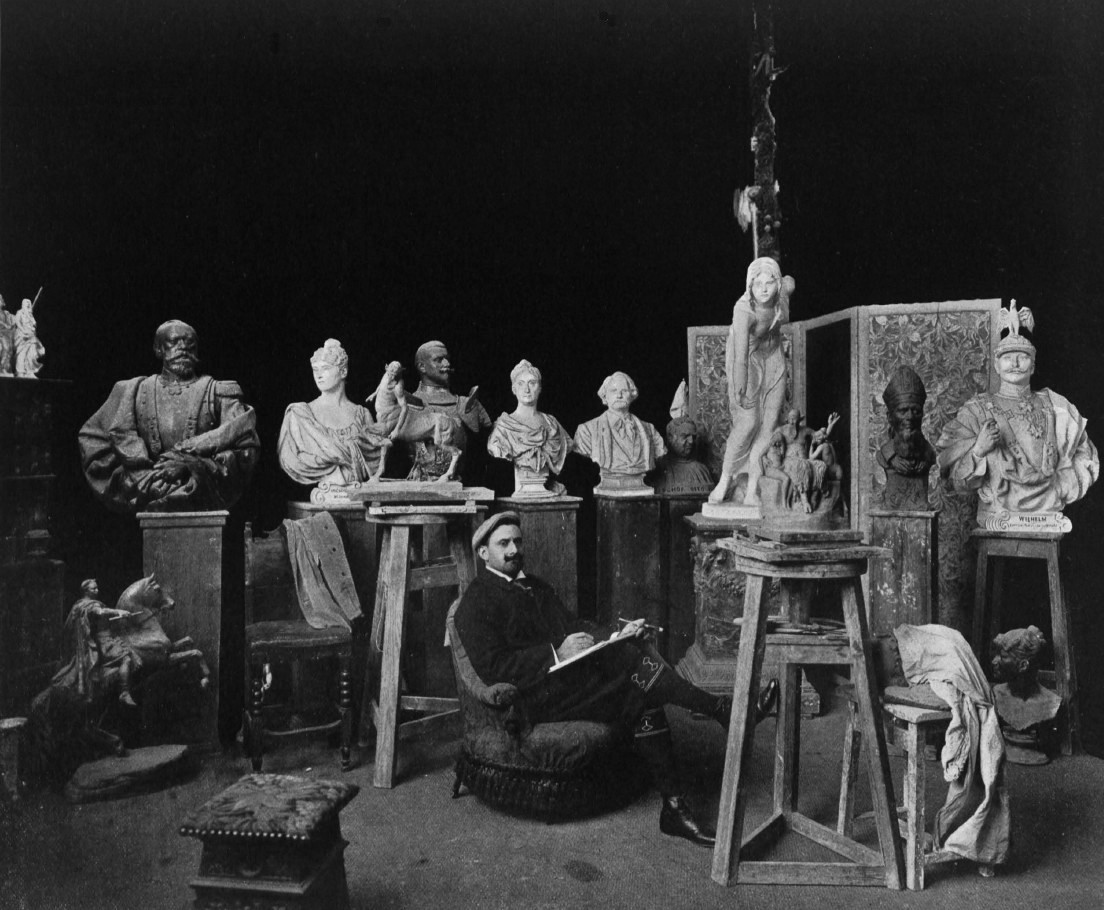
Walter Schott in his studio (1899)

Walter Schott (18 September 1861, Ilsenburg - 2 September 1938, Berlin) was a German sculptor and art professor.

== Life ==
His father, Eduard Schott, was a well-known metallurgist who was the manager and inspector at the smelters of Count Heinrich zu Stolberg-Wernigerode. After completing his standard education, he studied in Hanover from 1880 to 1883, at the Prussian Academy of Arts under Fritz Schaper.

After 1885, he worked as a free-lance sculptor in Berlin, creating statues in the prevailing Neo-Baroque style. Over the years, he became almost totally dependent on the Kaiser's patronage and found little work to do after World War I, a fate which befell many creative artists too closely associated with the Imperial government. In 1930, he wrote an autobiography, defending his position and assailing his critics.

He died in poverty. His remains were cremated and his ashes placed in an urn at his father's grave in Ilsenburg.

== Selected major works ==
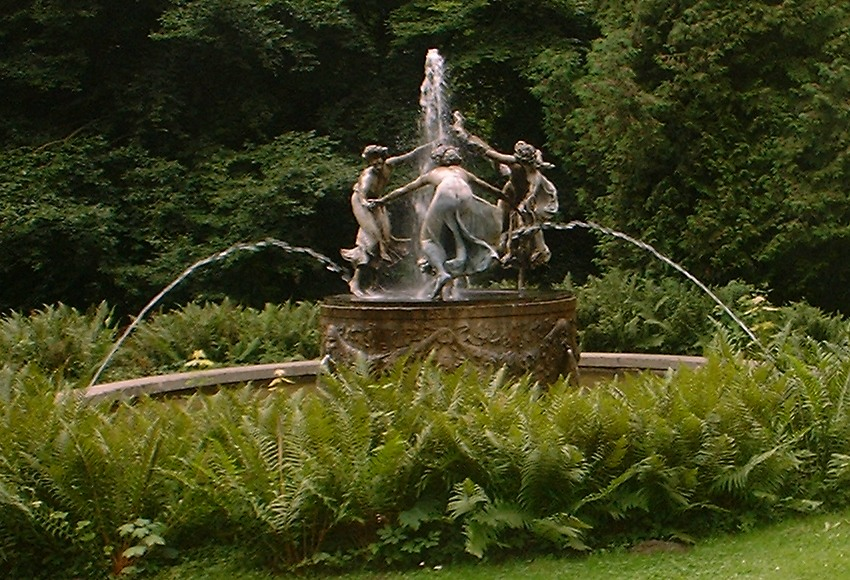
The original Three Dancing Maidens nymphenbrunnen in Mecklenburg

Mecklenburg

- Three Dancing Maidens, Nymphenbrunnen (Nymph Fountain), also referred to as Drei tanzende Mädchen. The original is believed to be in the park of Schlitz Castle near Lake Malchin, but there are several copies, most notably one in Central Park, New York, known as the Untermyer Fountain, and another in front of the Kasteel Den Brandt in Den Brandt Park in Antwerp. Several other three-quarter size copies are also known.

Berlin

- Figure Group 1 in the Siegesallee (Victory Avenue) project of Wilhelm II, consisting of Albert the Bear (first Margrave of Brandenburg) as the central figure; flanked by Bishop Wigger von Brandenburg (d.1161) and Bishop Otto of Bamberg. The statues were vandalized shortly after their dedication in 1898 and were severely damaged in World War II. They are now on display at the Spandau Citadel.
- Grave memorial for Else von Falckenberg in the Jerusalem II Friedhof am Halleschen Tor.
- Statue of William I, Prince of Orange in front of the Berlin Palace. The original was destroyed in World War II, but a copy of the statue in Wiesbaden, dating from 1908, still exists.
- Diana mit Windhunden (greyhounds), Bronze, 1926. Presented as a gift to the city of Berlin by the AEG in 1953. Currently in Humboldthain Park, Berlin-Gesundbrunnen

Saalburg

- Bust of Kaiser Wilhelm II. It was placed in storage by the Communist government in 1955 and was restored in 1998 as part of the ceremonies accompanying the 100th anniversary of the Saalburg's restoration.

Battlefield at Gravelotte in Alsace

- Monument honoring the First Foot Guards. It was unique among monuments relating to the Franco-Prussian War in that it also honored the fallen French soldiers. This was done at the suggestion of the Kaiser. After World War I, when Alsace was once again part of France, the French government removed the central angel figure and offered to sell it back to Germany. When the offer was refused, the statue was melted down. The base of the monument is still there.

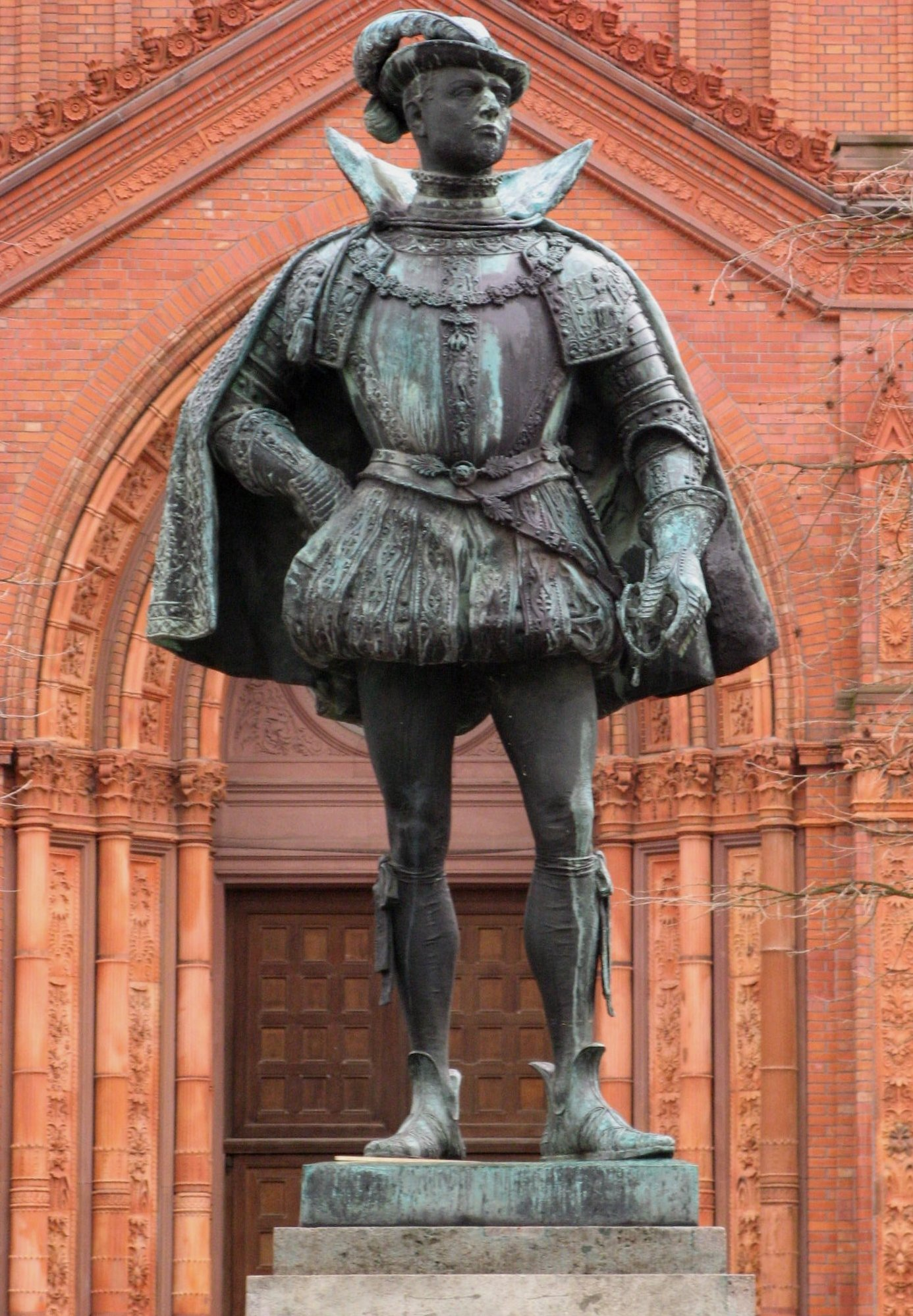
William of Orange; copy in Wiesbaden

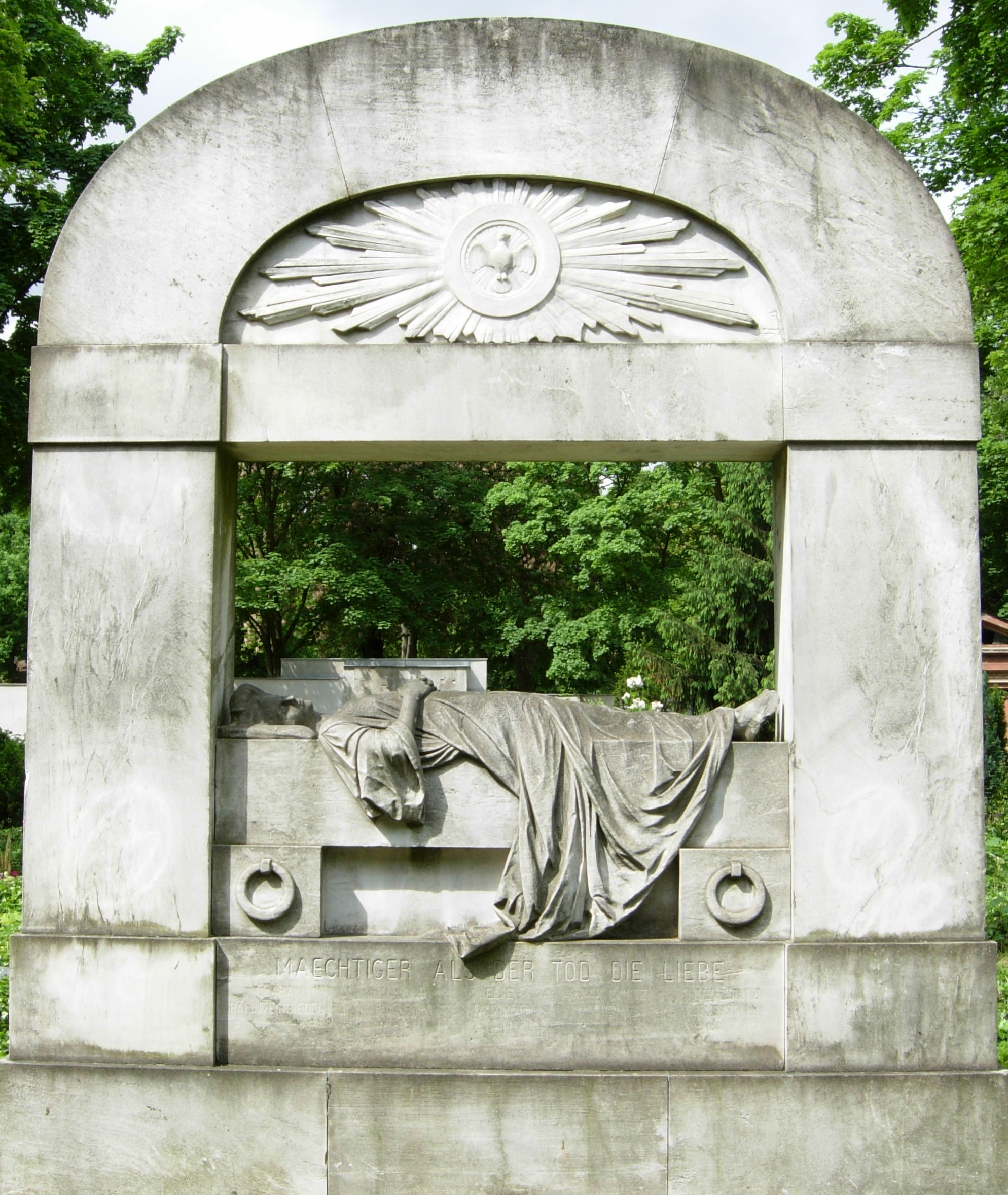
The Grave of Else von Falckenberg

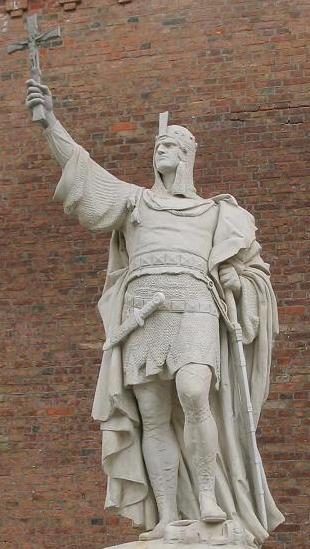
Albert the Bear

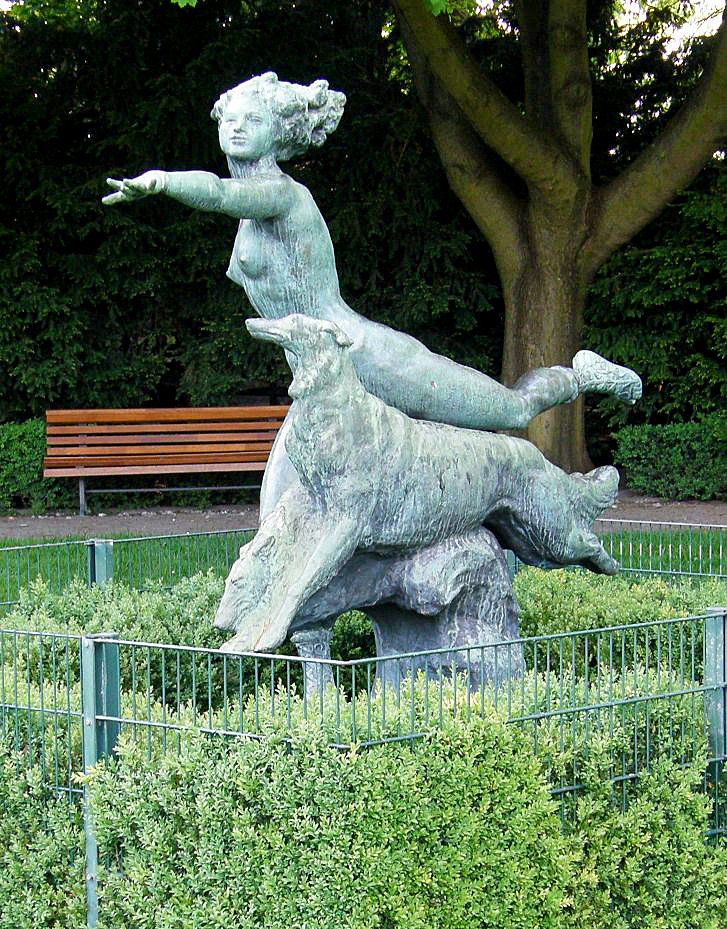
Hunting Nymph
