= Franz Iffland =

German sculptor and painter

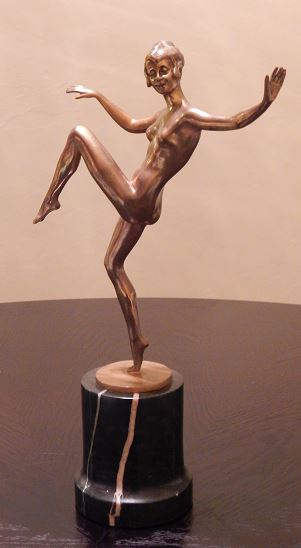
- An Art Deco bronze sculpture of a nude dancer by Franz Iffland (c. 1924)
- Born: 1862; Berlin, Kingdom of Prussia
- Died: 1935 (aged 72–73); Berlin, Nazi Germany
- Education: Königliche akademische Hochschule für die Bildenden Künste
- Known for: Sculpture
- Notable work: The Archer; Columbine
- Movement: Art Nouveau; Art Deco

Franz Iffland (1862–1935) was a German sculptor and painter who worked during the late 19th and early 20th century. He was born in 1862 in Berlin, Kingdom of Prussia. The majority of his sculptures were influenced by the Art Nouveau movement but late in his career, beginning in the mid-1920s, he produced a number of Art Deco sculptures. Iffland died in Berlin, Nazi Germany in 1935.

== Early career ==
Iffland received his formal training at the Königliche akademische Hochschule für die Bildenden Künste. He was primarily known for his small bronze statues of young children and bust sculptures of young women. He was a painter as well, however sculpture dominated his output during his career.

== Artistic style ==
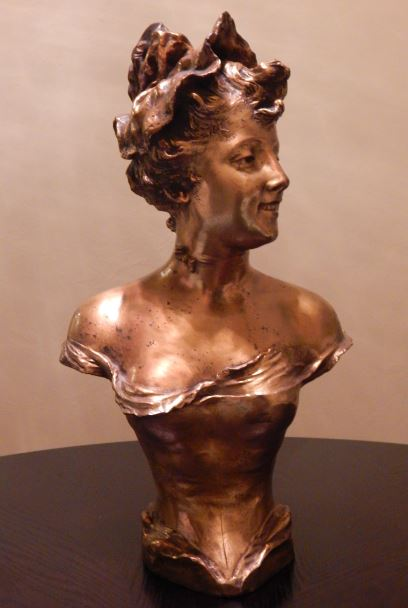
A gilt bronze bust of a young woman by Iffland, dated 1893

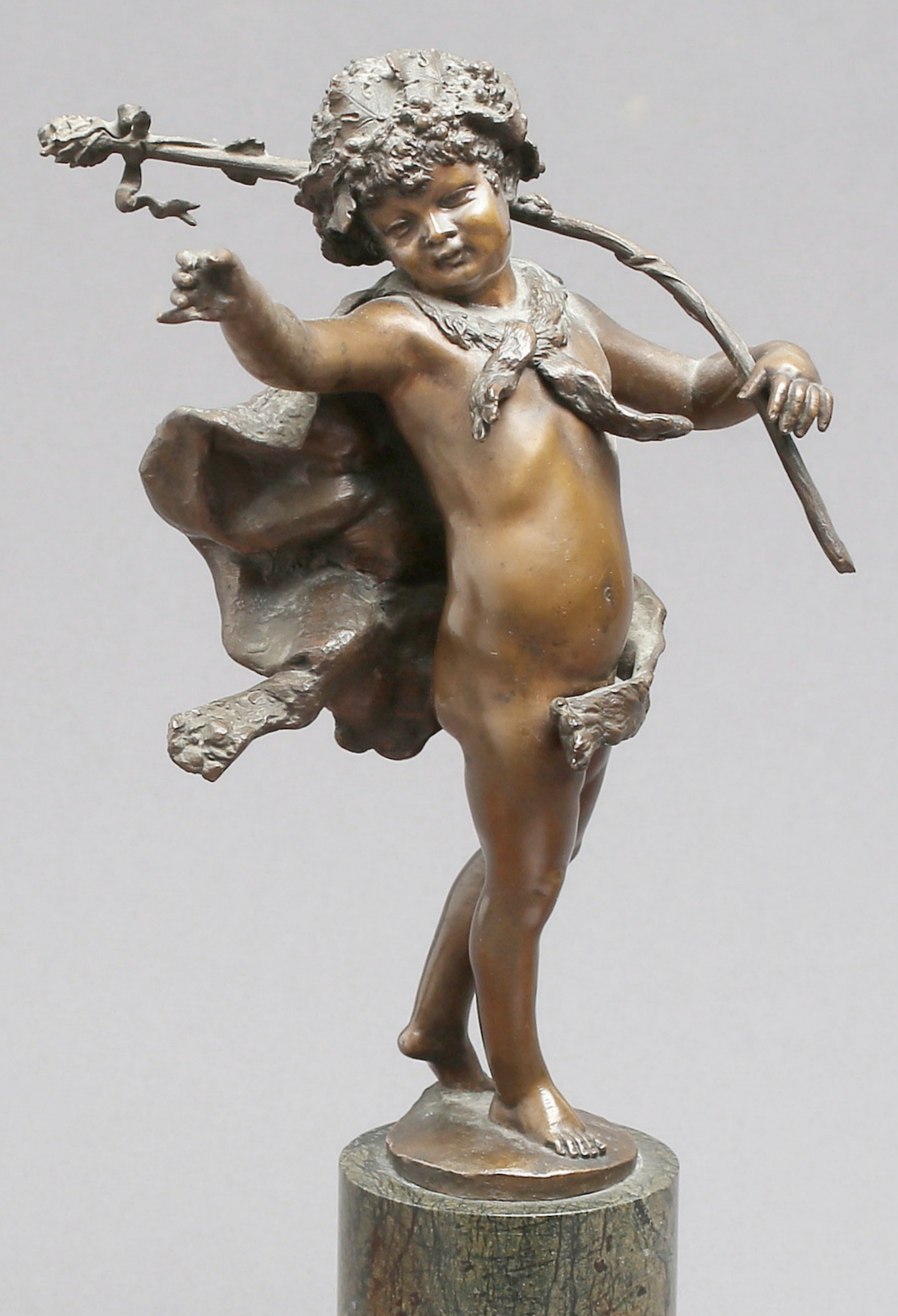
Young Bacchus, c. 1891. Attributes relate to Michelangelo's Bacchus statue: grapes, ivy, lion or leopard skin, goblet (missing from right hand)

The majority of his work was produced during the Art Nouveau or "jugendstil" period from 1887 to 1910, but late in his career he produced a number of art deco bronzes of nude women and genre statues of ordinary working people such as blacksmiths and farmers. One of Iffland's contemporaries, who worked during the same period as Iffland in Berlin and did similar types of sculptures, was Otto Schmidt-Hofer.

Iffland also executed a few animal sculptures and sporting figure statues of archers, javelin throwers, and polo players. He presented his work in bronze at the Große Berliner Kunstaustellung (Great Berlin Art Exhibition) in 1893.

Iffland typically applied dark brown patinas to his smaller bronzes but often elected to apply more elaborate patination to larger works intended for exhibition in art shows. A number of his more important statues featured gilt patinas in real 24 carat gold. Iffland's chryséléphantine pieces tend to bring the best prices at auction. One such example was Columbine which fetched $8,372 in a sale on 7 November 2007 at Christie's, London, South Kensington.

Iffland employed a number of foundries to cast his bronzes, including the Kraas foundry in Berlin. Many of his sculptures bear the Kraas foundry mark.

== Death and legacy ==
Iffland died in 1935 in Berlin, Germany. He is remembered as one of Germany's finest sculptors during the late 19th and early 20th century.

== Gallery ==
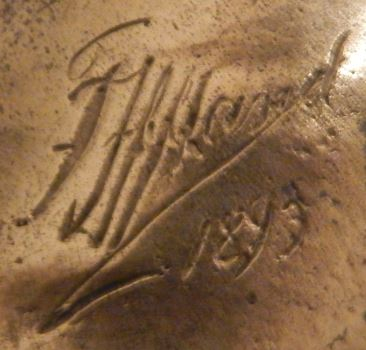
Iffland signature

Typical Iffland signature

== Literature ==
Franz Iffland. Ulrich Thieme; Felix Becker – Allgemeines Lexikon der Bildenden Künstler von der Antike bis zur Gegenwart. Band 18, E. A. Seemann, Leipzig 1925, S. 549.
