= Chryselephantine sculpture =

Ancient Greek sculpture made with gold and ivory

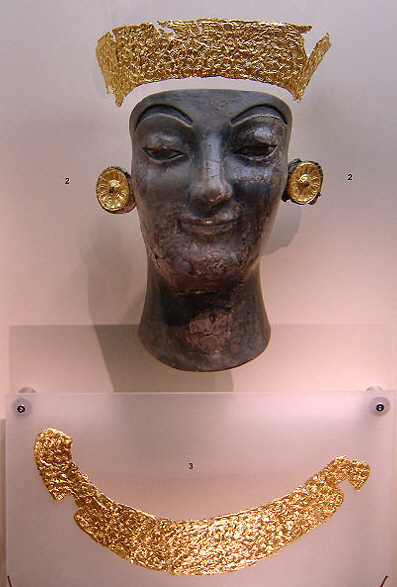
Gold and fire-blackened ivory fragments of a burnt Archaic chryselephantine statue (Delphi Archaeological Museum)

Chryselephantine sculptures (from Ancient Greek χρυσός (khrusós) 'gold' and ἐλεφάντινος (elephántinos) 'ivory') are sculptures made with gold and ivory. Chryselephantine cult statues enjoyed high status in Ancient Greece.

== Ancient examples ==
Chryselephantine statues were built around a wooden frame with thin carved slabs of ivory attached, representing the flesh, and sheets of gold leaf representing the garments, armour, hair, and other details. In some cases, glass paste, glass, and precious and semi-precious stones were used for detail such as eyes, jewellery, and weaponry.

The origins of the technique are obscure. There are known examples, from the 2nd millennium BC, of composite sculptures made of ivory and gold from areas that became part of the Greek world, most famously the so-called "Palaikastro Kouros" (not to be confused with the Archaic Kouros statues), from Minoan Palaikastro, c. 1450 BC. It is likely the only enshrined Minoan cult image that has survived. It is, however, not clear whether the Greek chryselephantine tradition is connected with these.

Chryselephantine sculpture became widespread during the Archaic period. Later, acrolithitic statues, with marble heads and extremities and a wooden trunk either gilded or covered in drapery, were a comparable technique used for cult images.

The technique was normally used for cult statues within temples; typically, they were greater than life-sized. Construction was modular, so that some of the gold could be removed and melted for coin or bullion in times of severe financial hardship, to be replaced later when finances had recovered. For example, the figure of Nike held in the right hand of Phidias's Athena Parthenos was made from solid gold with this very purpose in mind. Indeed, in times of prosperity, up to six solid gold Nikae were cast, serving as a "sacred treasury" whose safety was ensured by the sanctity accorded to a cult object, as well as the presence of priestesses, priests, and maintenance staff at the temple.

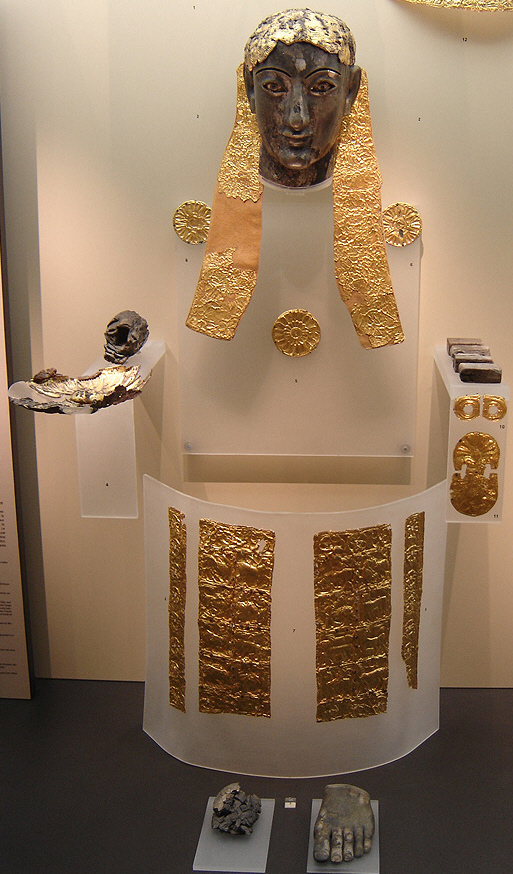
Fragments of a burnt chryselephantine statue thought by some scholars to depict Apollo (Delphi Archaeological Museum)

The two best-known examples, both from the Classical period, are those sculpted by Phidias: the 13-metre tall (43 ft) standing statue of Athena Parthenos in the Parthenon at Athens, and the 12-metre (39 ft) seated statue of Zeus in the temple at Olympia, considered one of the Seven Wonders of the Ancient World.

Chryselephantine statues were not only intended to be visually striking; they also displayed the wealth and cultural achievements of those who constructed them or financed their construction. The creation of such a statue involved skills in sculpture, carpentry, jewellery, and ivory-carving. Once completed, the statues required constant maintenance. It is known that at Olympia, skilled personnel were employed to ensure the upkeep of the Zeus statue. In the second century BC, the prominent sculptor Damophon of Messene was commissioned to repair it.

Due to the high value of some of the materials used and the perishable nature of others, most chryselephantine statues were destroyed during antiquity and the Middle Ages. For example, of the statue of Athena Parthenos, only the hole that held its central wooden support survives today in the floor of her temple. The appearance of the statue is nevertheless known from a number of miniature marble copies discovered in Athens, as well as from a detailed description by Pausanias. Pausanias also described Phidias's statue of Zeus at Olympia. Here, some of the clay moulds for parts of Zeus's garments made of glass or glass-paste have been discovered in the building known as the "Workshop of Phidias". They are the only finds directly associated with the great sculptor's most famous works and thus provide useful information on their creation.

Few examples of chryselephantine sculpture have been found. The most prominent surviving examples are fragments of several smaller than life-sized burnt statues from the Archaic period, discovered at Delphi. It is not known whom they depict, although they are assumed to represent deities.

== Modern examples ==
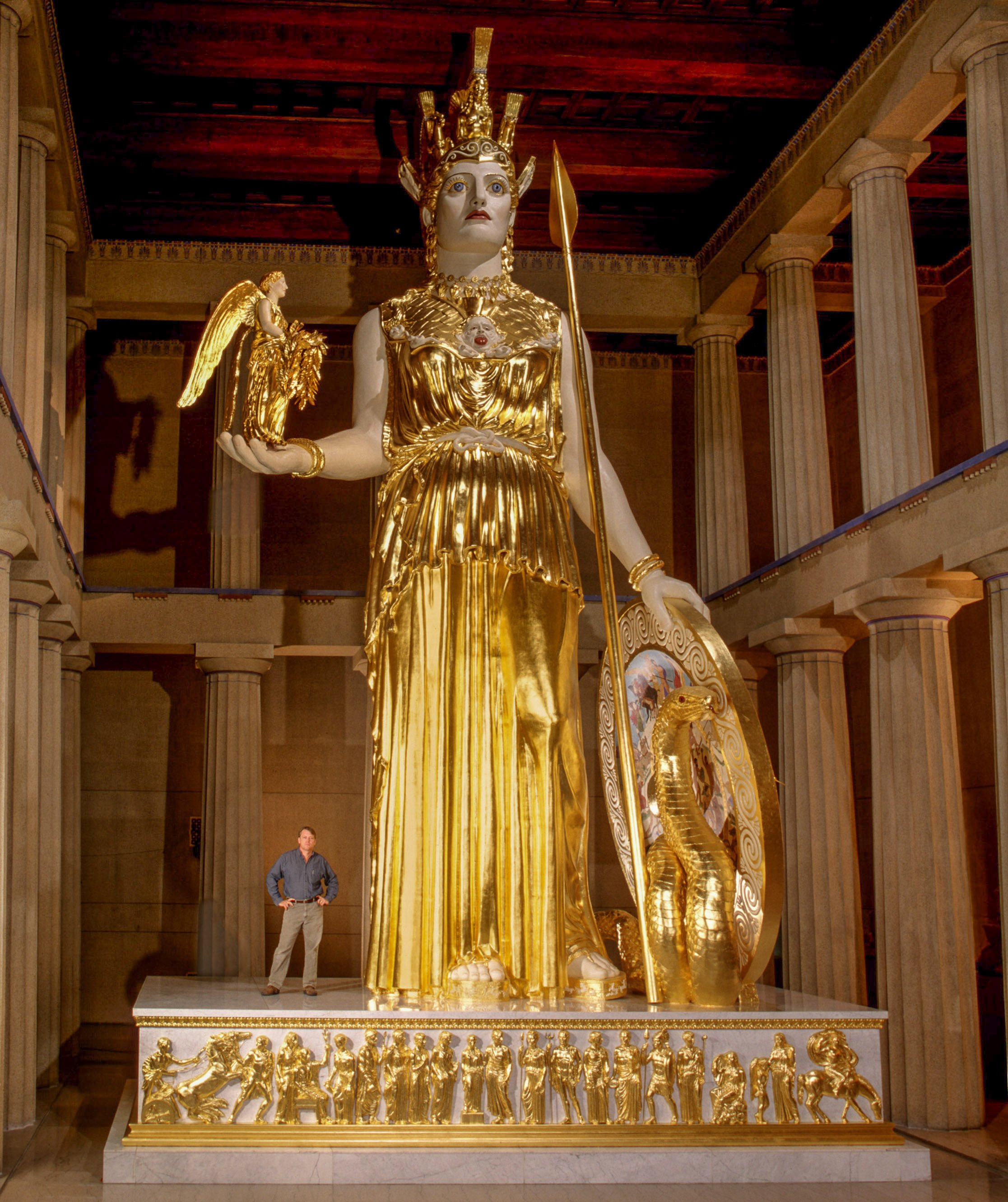
Reproduction of the Athena Parthenos in the full-scale reproduction of the Parthenon in the U.S. state of Tennessee.

The term chryselephantine is also used for a style of sculpture fairly common in 19th-century European art, especially Art Nouveau. In this context, it describes statuettes with skin of ivory and clothing and other details made of other materials, such as gold, bronze, marble, silver, or onyx. For instance, circa 1840 the sculptor Pierre-Charles Simart produced a copy in ivory and gold, based on ancient descriptions, of the Athena Parthenos of Phidias for patron Honoré Théodoric d'Albert de Luynes. The result was somewhat disappointing: "... it cost Luynes a hundred thousand francs to prove that Simart was not Phidias." A 20th-century version of this figure by American sculptor Alan LeQuire stands in the modern reproduction of the Parthenon in Nashville, Tennessee. After the 1890s, reflecting the change that Simart and some sculptors had already embraced, the meaning of chryselephantine was extended to include any statue fashioned in a combination of ivory with other materials.

In the early 20th century, German sculptors Ferdinand Preiss and Franz Iffland became well known for their chryselephantine sculptures. A number of other European sculptors also produced chryselephantine pieces, among them Joé Descomps, Josef Lorenzl, Georges Omerth, Claire J. R. Colinet, Pierre Le Faguays, D. H. Chiparus, Bruno Zach, and Dominique Alonzo.

== See also ==
- Art in ancient Greece
- Classical sculpture
- Ram in a Thicket
