= Ivory =

Material derived from the tusks and teeth of animals

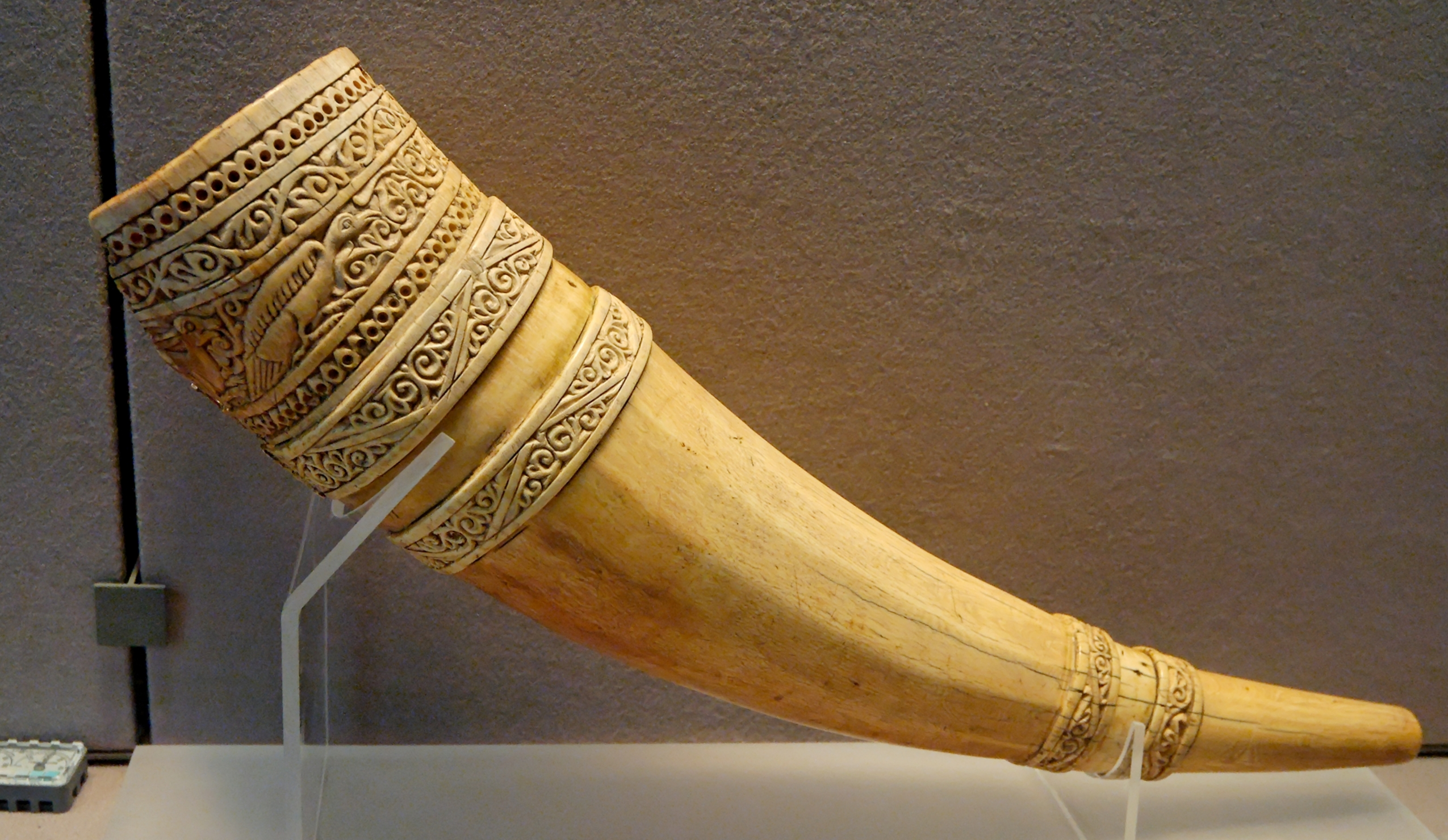
11th-century Italian carved elephant tusk, Louvre.

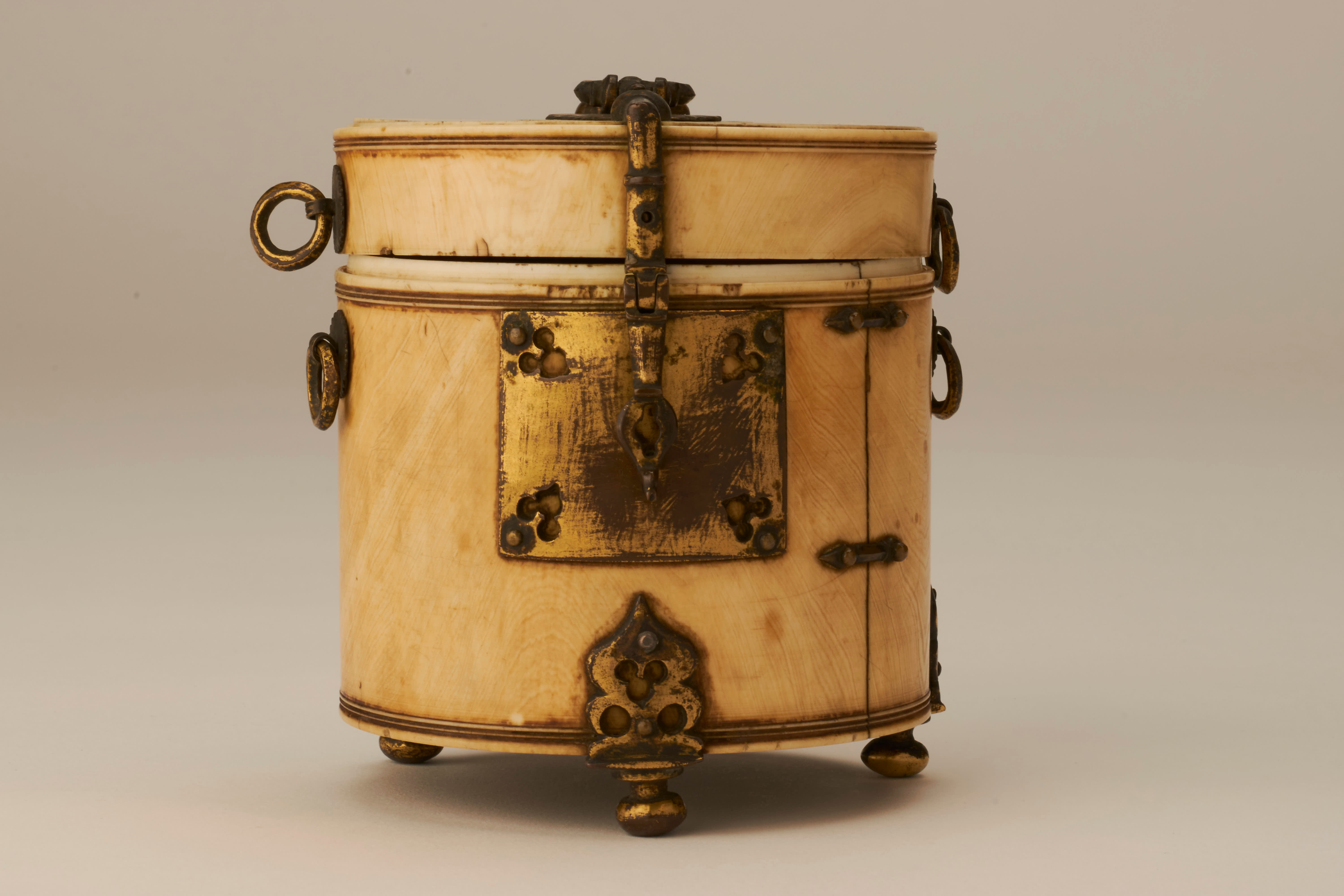
Cylindrical ivory casket, Siculo-Arabic, Hunt Museum.

Ivory is a hard, white material from the tusks (traditionally from elephants) and teeth of animals, that consists mainly of dentin, one of the physical structures of teeth and tusks. The chemical structure of the teeth and tusks of mammals is the same, regardless of the species of origin, but ivory contains structures of mineralized collagen. The trade in certain tusks and teeth other than elephant is well established and widespread; therefore, "ivory" can correctly be used to describe any mammalian teeth or tusks of commercial interest which are large enough to be carved or scrimshawed.

Besides natural ivory, ivory can also be produced synthetically, hence (unlike natural ivory) not requiring the retrieval of the material from animals. Tagua nuts can also be carved like ivory.

The trade of finished goods of ivory products has its origins in the Indus Valley. Ivory is a main product that is seen in abundance and was used for trading in Harappan civilization. Finished ivory products that were seen in Harappan sites include kohl sticks, pins, awls, hooks, toggles, combs, game pieces, dice, inlay and other personal ornaments.

Ivory has been valued since ancient times in art or manufacturing for making a range of items from ivory carvings to false teeth, piano keys, fans, and dominoes. Elephant ivory is the most important source, but ivory from mammoth, walrus, hippopotamus, sperm whale, orca, narwhal and warthog is used as well. Elk also have two ivory teeth, which are believed to be the remnants of tusks from their ancestors.

The national and international trade in natural ivory of threatened species, such as African and Asian elephants, is illegal. The word ivory ultimately derives from the ancient Egyptian âb, âbu ('elephant'), through the Latin ebor- or ebur.

== Uses ==
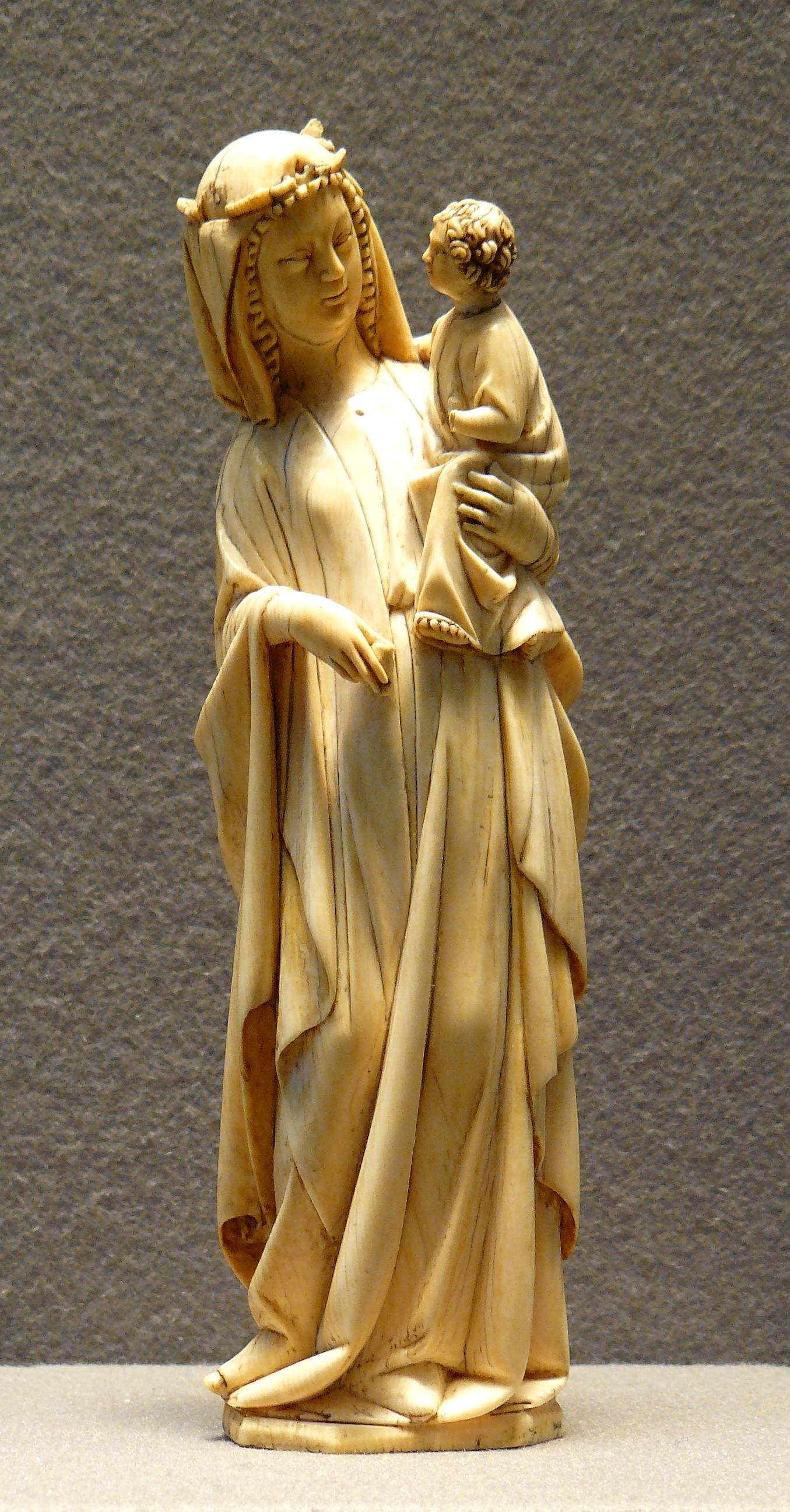
A depiction of the Blessed Virgin Mary and the Child Jesus crafted in elephant ivory

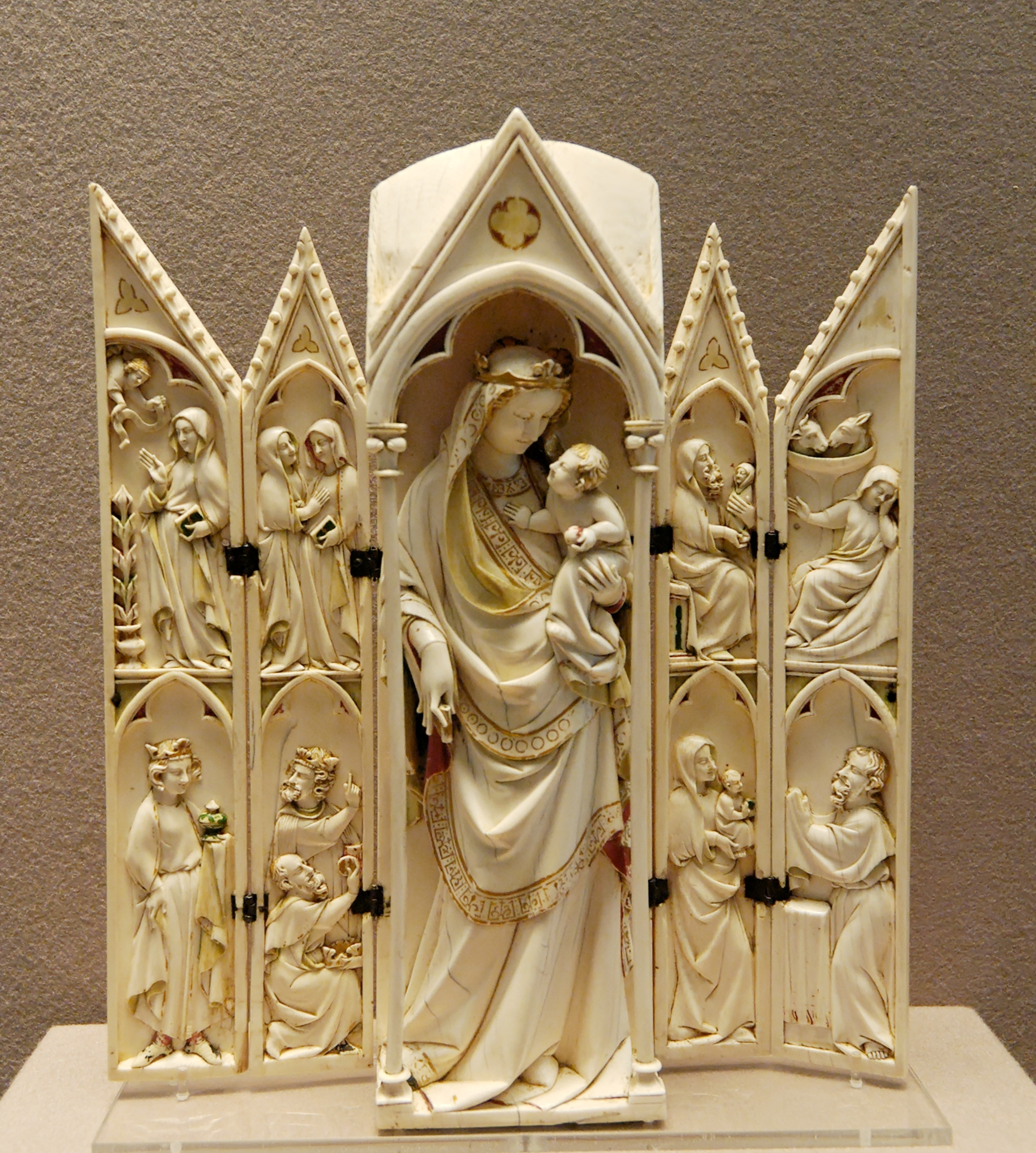
An ivory tabernacle featuring the Madonna of Caress, France

Both the Greek and Roman civilizations practiced ivory carving to make large quantities of high-value works of art, precious religious objects, and decorative boxes for costly objects. Ivory was often used to form the white of the eyes of statues.

There is some evidence of either whale or walrus ivory used by the ancient Irish. Solinus, a Roman writer in the 3rd century claimed that the Celtic peoples in Ireland would decorate their sword-hilts with the 'teeth of beasts that swim in the sea'. Adomnan of Iona wrote a story about St Columba giving a sword decorated with carved ivory as a gift that a penitent would bring to his master so he could redeem himself from slavery.

The Syrian and North African elephant populations were reduced to extinction, probably due to the demand for ivory in the Classical world.

The Chinese have long valued ivory for both art and utilitarian objects. Early reference to the Chinese export of ivory is recorded after the Chinese explorer Zhang Qian ventured to the west to form alliances to enable the eventual free movement of Chinese goods to the west; as early as the first century BC, ivory was moved along the Northern Silk Road for consumption by western nations. Southeast Asian kingdoms included tusks of the Indian elephant in their annual tribute caravans to China. Chinese craftsmen carved ivory to make everything from images of deities to the pipe stems and end pieces of opium pipes.

In Japan, ivory carvings became popular in the 17th century during the Edo period, and many netsuke and kiseru, on which animals and legendary creatures were carved, and inro, on which ivory was inlaid, were made. From the mid-1800s, the new Meiji government's policy of promoting and exporting arts and crafts led to the frequent display of elaborate ivory crafts at World's fair. Among them, the best works were admired because they were purchased by Western museums, wealthy people, and the Japanese Imperial Family.

The Buddhist cultures of Southeast Asia, including Myanmar, Thailand, Laos and Cambodia, traditionally harvested ivory from their domesticated elephants. Ivory was prized for containers due to its ability to keep an airtight seal. It was also commonly carved into elaborate seals utilized by officials to "sign" documents and decrees by stamping them with their unique official seal.

In Southeast Asian countries, where Muslim Malay peoples live, such as Malaysia, Indonesia and the Philippines, ivory was the material of choice for making the handles of kris daggers. In the Philippines, ivory was also used to craft the faces and hands of Catholic icons and images of saints prevalent in the Santero culture.

Tooth and tusk ivory can be carved into a vast variety of shapes and objects. Examples of modern carved ivory objects are okimono, netsukes, jewelry, flatware handles, furniture inlays, and piano keys. Additionally, warthog tusks, and teeth from sperm whales, orcas and hippos can also be scrimshawed or superficially carved, thus retaining their morphologically recognizable shapes.

As trade with Africa expanded during the first part of the 1800s, ivory became readily available. Up to 90 percent of the ivory imported into the United States was processed, at one time, in Connecticut where Deep River and Ivoryton in 1860s became the centers of ivory milling, in particular, due to the demand for ivory piano keys.

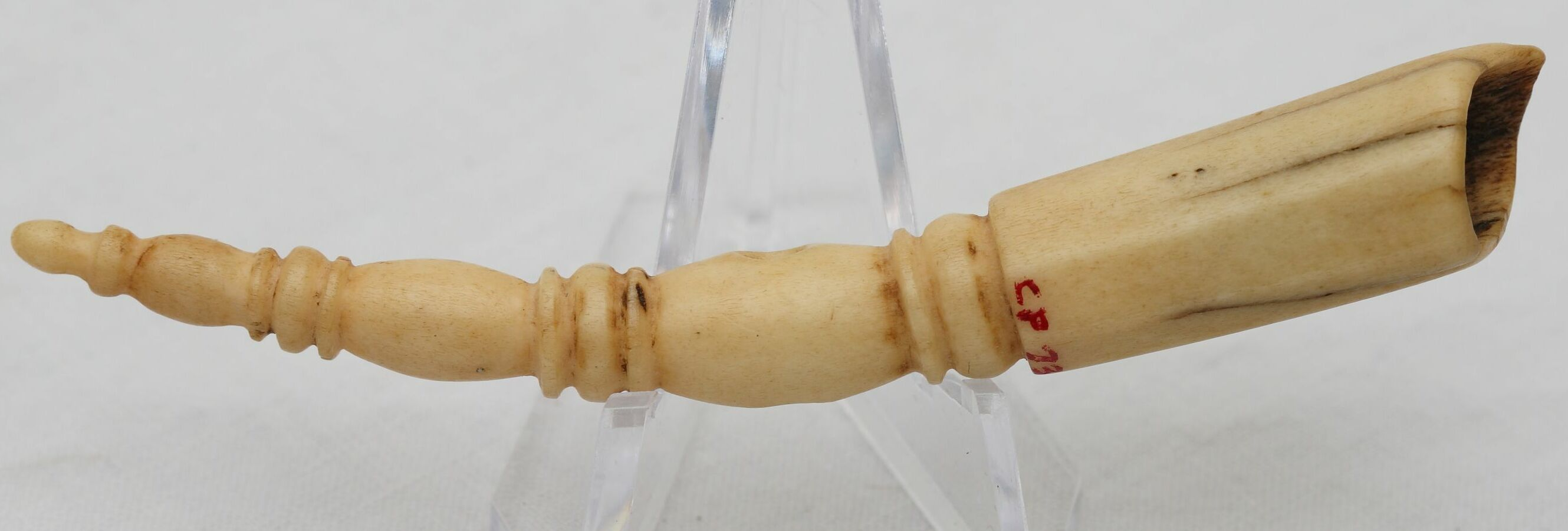
An ivory powder measure from the collection of Conner Prairie

Ivory usage in the last thirty years has moved towards mass production of souvenirs and jewelry. In Japan, the increase in wealth sparked consumption of solid ivory hanko – name seals – which before this time had been made of wood. These hanko can be carved out in a matter of seconds using machinery and were partly responsible for massive African elephant decline in the 1980s, when the African elephant population went from 1.3 million to around 600,000 in ten years.

Carving of walrus ivory is permitted for Arctic Indigenous peoples in the USA, but the export of raw ivory is prohibited; surveys by a team led by EcoVerde Global Consulting showed that raw walrus tusks from the USA are illegally exported to Indonesia (Bali) where they are carved in traditional motifs and exported back to the US market.

== Consumption before plastics ==
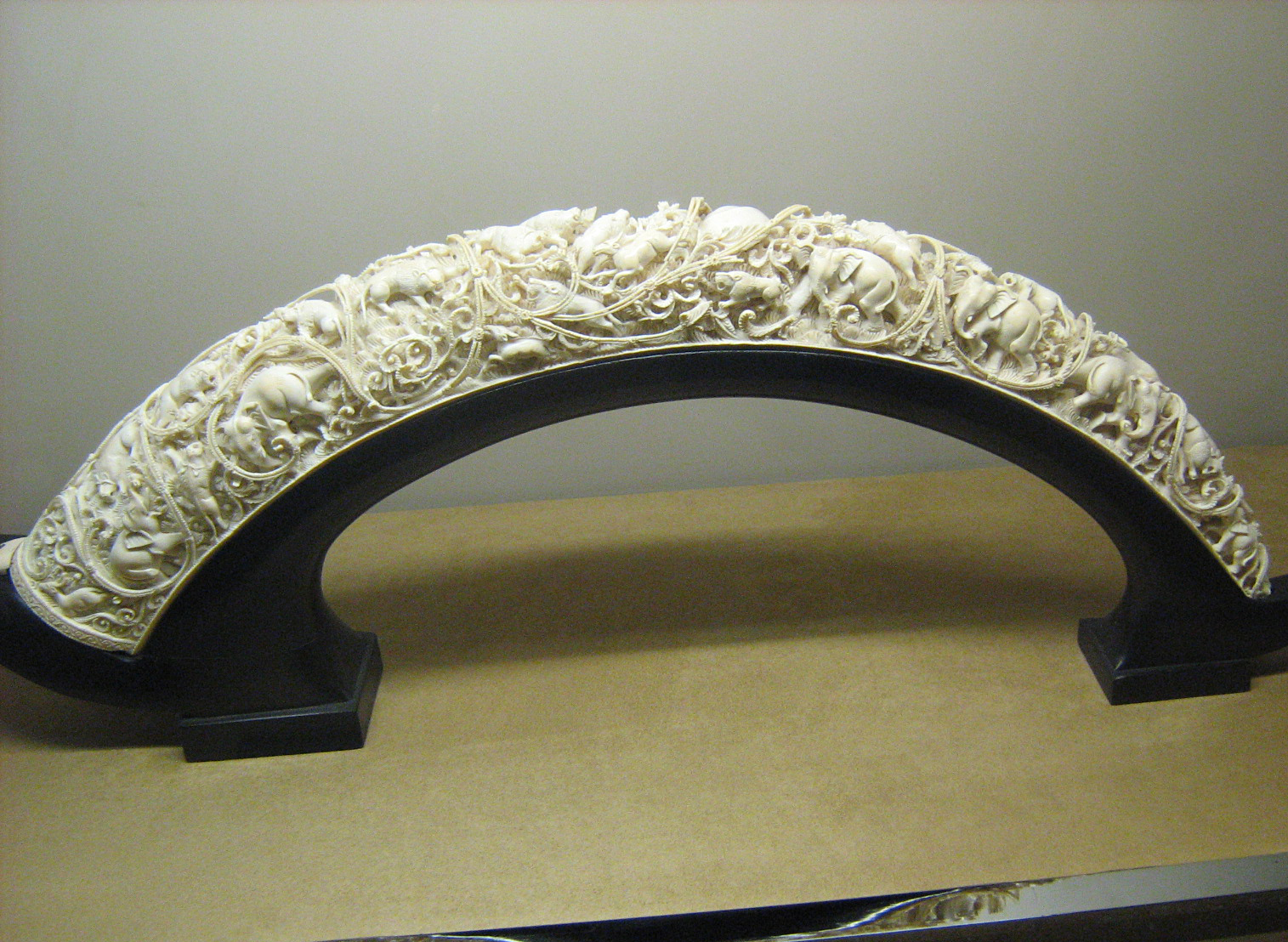
An elaborately carved ivory tusk in Sa'dabad Palace, Iran

Before plastics were introduced, ivory had many ornamental and practical uses, mainly because of the white color it presents when processed. It was formerly used to make cutlery handles, billiard balls, piano keys, Scottish bagpipes, buttons and a wide range of ornamental items.

Synthetic substitutes for ivory in the use of most of these items have been developed since 1800: the billiard industry challenged inventors to come up with an alternative material that could be manufactured; the piano industry abandoned ivory as a key-covering material in the 1970s.

Ivory can be taken from dead animals – however, most ivory came from elephants that were killed for their tusks. For example, in 1930 to acquire 40 tons of ivory required the killing of approximately 700 elephants. Other animals which are now endangered were also preyed upon, for example, hippos, which have very hard white ivory prized for making artificial teeth. In the first half of the 20th century, Kenyan elephant herds were devastated because of demand for ivory, to be used for piano keys.

During the Art Deco era from 1912 to 1940, dozens (if not hundreds) of European artists used ivory in the production of chryselephantine statues. Two of the most frequent users of ivory in their sculptured artworks were Ferdinand Preiss and Claire Colinet.

== Mechanical characteristics ==
While many uses of ivory are purely ornamental in nature, it often must be carved and manipulated into different shapes to achieve the desired form. Other applications, such as ivory piano keys, introduce repeated wear and surface handling of the material. It is therefore essential to consider the mechanical properties of ivory when designing alternatives.

Elephant tusks are the animal's incisors, so the composition of ivory is unsurprisingly similar to that of teeth in several other mammals. It is composed of dentine, a biomineral composite constructed from collagen fibers mineralized with hydroxyapatite. This composite lends ivory the impressive mechanical properties—high stiffness, strength, hardness, and toughness—required for its use in the animal's day-to-day activities. Ivory has a measured hardness of 35 on the Vickers scale, exceeding that of bone. It also has a flexural modulus of 14 GPa, a flexural strength of 378 MPa a fracture toughness of 2.05 MPam^{1/2}. These measured values indicate that ivory mechanically outperforms most of its most common alternatives, including celluloid plastic and polyethylene terephthalate.

Ivory's mechanical properties result from the microstructure of the dentine tissue. It is thought that the structural arrangement of mineralized collagen fibers could contribute to the checkerboard-like Schreger pattern observed in polished ivory samples. This is often used as an attribute in ivory identification. As well as being an optical feature, the Schreger pattern could point towards a micropattern well-designed to prevent crack propagation by dispersing stresses. Additionally, this intricate microstructure lends a strong anisotropy to ivory's mechanical characteristics. Separate hardness measurements on three orthogonal tusk directions indicated that circumferential planes of tusk had up to 25% greater hardness than radial planes of the same specimen. During hardness testing, inelastic and elastic recovery was observed on circumferential planes while the radial planes displayed plastic deformation. This implies that ivory has directional viscoelasticity. These anisotropic properties can be explained by the reinforcement of collagen fibers in the composite oriented along the circumference.

== Availability ==
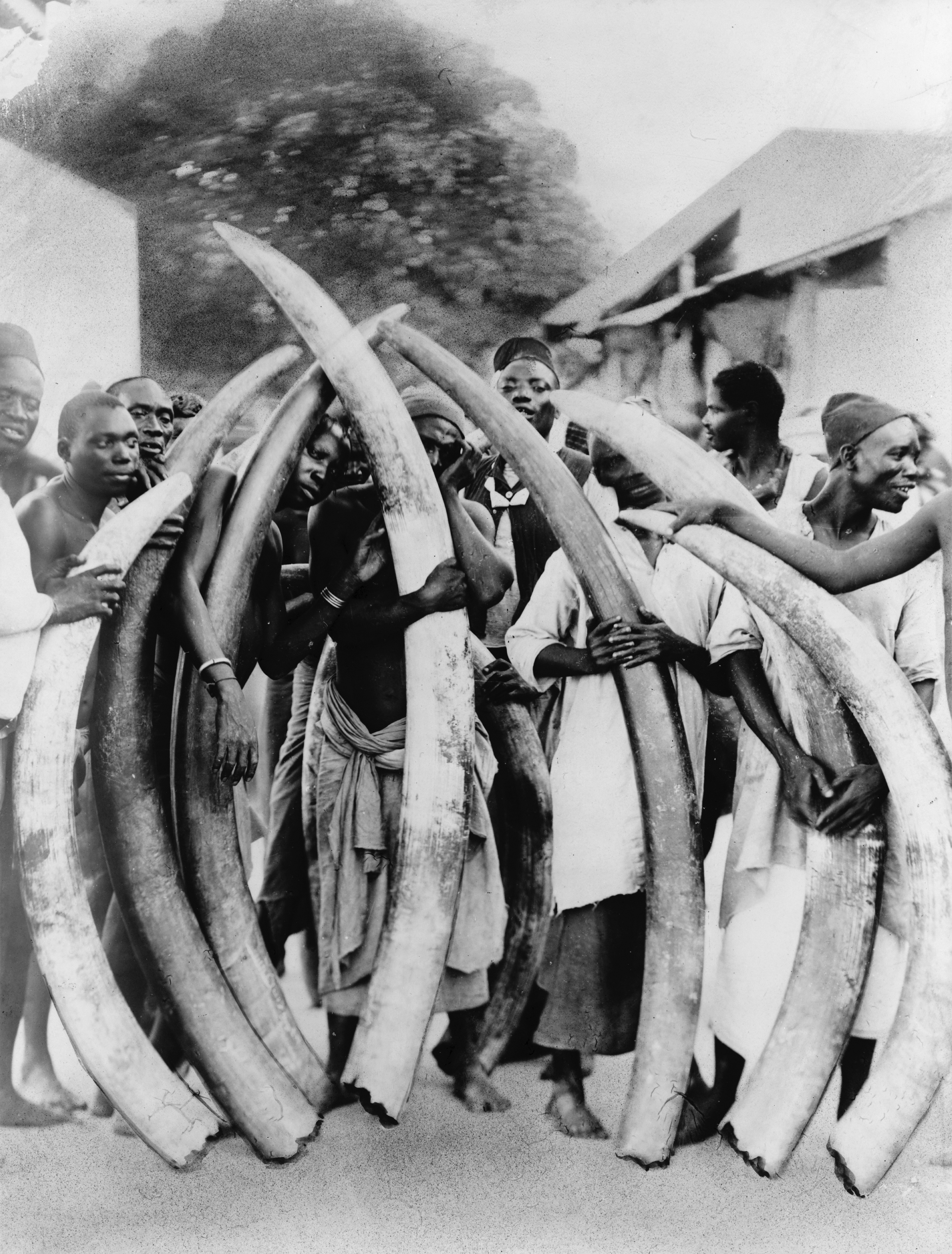
Men with elephant tusks, Dar es Salaam, c. 1900

Owing to the rapid decline in the populations of the animals that produce it, the importation and sale of ivory in many countries is banned or severely restricted. In the ten years preceding a decision in 1989 by CITES to ban international trade in African elephant ivory, the population of African elephants declined from 1.3 million to around 600,000. It was found by investigators from the Environmental Investigation Agency (EIA) that CITES sales of stockpiles from Singapore and Burundi (270 tonnes and 89.5 tonnes respectively) had created a system that increased the value of ivory on the international market, thus rewarding international smugglers and giving them the ability to control the trade and continue smuggling new ivory.

Since the ivory ban, some Southern African countries have claimed their elephant populations are stable or increasing, and argued that ivory sales would support their conservation efforts. Other African countries oppose this position, stating that renewed ivory trading puts their own elephant populations under greater threat from poachers reacting to demand. CITES allowed the sale of 49 tonnes of ivory from Zimbabwe, Namibia and Botswana in 1997 to Japan.

In 2007, under pressure from the International Fund for Animal Welfare, eBay banned all international sales of elephant-ivory products. The decision came after several mass slaughters of African elephants, most notably the 2006 Zakouma elephant slaughter in Chad. The IFAW found that up to 90% of the elephant-ivory transactions on eBay violated their own wildlife policies and could potentially be illegal. In October 2008, eBay expanded the ban, disallowing any sales of ivory on eBay.

A more recent sale in 2008 of 108 tonnes from the three countries and South Africa took place to Japan and China. The inclusion of China as an "approved" importing country created enormous controversy, despite being supported by CITES, the World Wide Fund for Nature and Traffic. They argued that China had controls in place and the sale might depress prices. However, the price of ivory in China has skyrocketed. Some believe this may be due to deliberate price fixing by those who bought the stockpile, echoing the warnings from the Japan Wildlife Conservation Society on price-fixing after sales to Japan in 1997, and monopoly given to traders who bought stockpiles from Burundi and Singapore in the 1980s.

A 2019 peer-reviewed study reported that the rate of African elephant poaching was in decline, with the annual poaching mortality rate peaking at over 10% in 2011 and falling to below 4% by 2017. The study found that the "annual poaching rates in 53 sites strongly correlate with proxies of ivory demand in the main Chinese markets, whereas between-country and between-site variation is strongly associated with indicators of corruption and poverty." Based on these findings, the study authors recommended action to both reduce demand for ivory in China and other main markets and to decrease corruption and poverty in Africa.

In 2006, nineteen African countries signed the "Accra Declaration" calling for a total ivory trade ban, and twenty range states attended a meeting in Kenya calling for a 20-year moratorium in 2007.

Methods of obtaining ivory can be divided into:

- Shooting the elephant to take its tusks: this method is of concern here.
- Taking tusks from an elephant which has died of natural causes.
- Taking tusks from an elephant which has had to be put down for another reason, for example, severe arthritis, or if its last molar teeth are worn out and can no longer chew its food.
- Among working elephants which use their tusks to carry logs, there is an optimal tusk length. In former times, tusks were often cut back to this length (and often the shortened tusks' ends were bound in copper). This periodically freed pieces of ivory for the carving trade.

=== Controversy and conservation issues ===
The use and trade of elephant ivory have become controversial because they have contributed to seriously declining elephant populations in many countries. It is estimated that consumption in Great Britain alone in 1831 amounted to the deaths of nearly 4,000 elephants. In 1975, the Asian elephant was placed on Appendix I of the Convention on International Trade in Endangered Species (CITES), which prevents international trade between member states of species that are threatened by trade. The African elephant was placed on Appendix I in January 1990. Since then, some southern African countries have had their populations of elephants "downlisted" to Appendix II, allowing the domestic trade of non-ivory items; there have also been two "one off" sales of ivory stockpiles.

In June 2015, more than a ton of confiscated ivory was crushed in New York City's Times Square by the Wildlife Conservation Society to send a message that the illegal trade will not be tolerated. The ivory, confiscated in New York and Philadelphia, was sent up a conveyor belt into a rock crusher. The Wildlife Conservation Society has pointed out that the global ivory trade leads to the slaughter of up to 35,000 elephants a year in Africa. In June 2018, Conservative MEPs' Deputy Leader Jacqueline Foster MEP urged the EU to follow the UK's lead and introduce a tougher ivory ban across Europe.

China was the biggest market for poached ivory but announced they would phase out the legal domestic manufacture and sale of ivory products in May 2015. In September of the same year, China and the U.S. announced they would "enact a nearly complete ban on the import and export of ivory." The Chinese market has a high degree of influence on the elephant population.

=== Alternatives ===
==== Fossil mammoth tusks ====
Trade in the ivory from the tusks of dead woolly mammoths frozen in the tundra has occurred for 300 years and continues to be legal. Mammoth ivory is used today to make handcrafted knives and similar implements. Mammoth ivory is rare and costly because mammoths have been extinct for millennia, and scientists are hesitant to sell museum-worthy specimens in pieces. Some estimates suggest that 10 million mammoths or more are still buried in Siberia.

==== Fossil walrus ivory ====
Fossil walrus ivory from animals that died before 1972 is legal to buy and sell in the United States, unlike many other types of ivory.

==== Elk ivory ====
The ancestors of elk had teeth, also known as elk ivory, that protruded outwards, similar to animals that have tusks. These served as protection from predators, and for asserting dominance during the mating season. These elk once had much smaller antlers compared to the size of modern-day species' antlers. Elk antlers evolved to become bigger and the use of their tusks diminished as antlers grew, thus evolving towards a smaller size over time, making them nothing more than teeth in their mouths.

These teeth have the same chemical compound as the ivory found in the highly used and poached elephant tusks, making it another good alternative when it comes to taking ivory as the teeth can be possibly removed without harming the elk themselves.

Among Native Americans and First Nations in elk range, primarily within the Great Plains, Rocky Mountains, and Pacific Northwest, elk teeth has major significance when it comes to jewelry. Among women, men wore them as well. Either through bracelets, earrings, and chokers, there was deeper meaning for both men and women within the tribes. For the women, it was believed that it would bring in good luck and good health. As for the men, it was seen that they were a good hunter.

==== Synthetic ivory ====
Ivory can also be produced synthetically.

==== Nuts ====
A species of hard nut is gaining popularity as a replacement for ivory, although its size limits its usability. It is sometimes called vegetable ivory, or tagua, and is the seed endosperm of the ivory nut palm commonly found in coastal rainforests of Ecuador, Peru and Colombia.

== Gallery ==
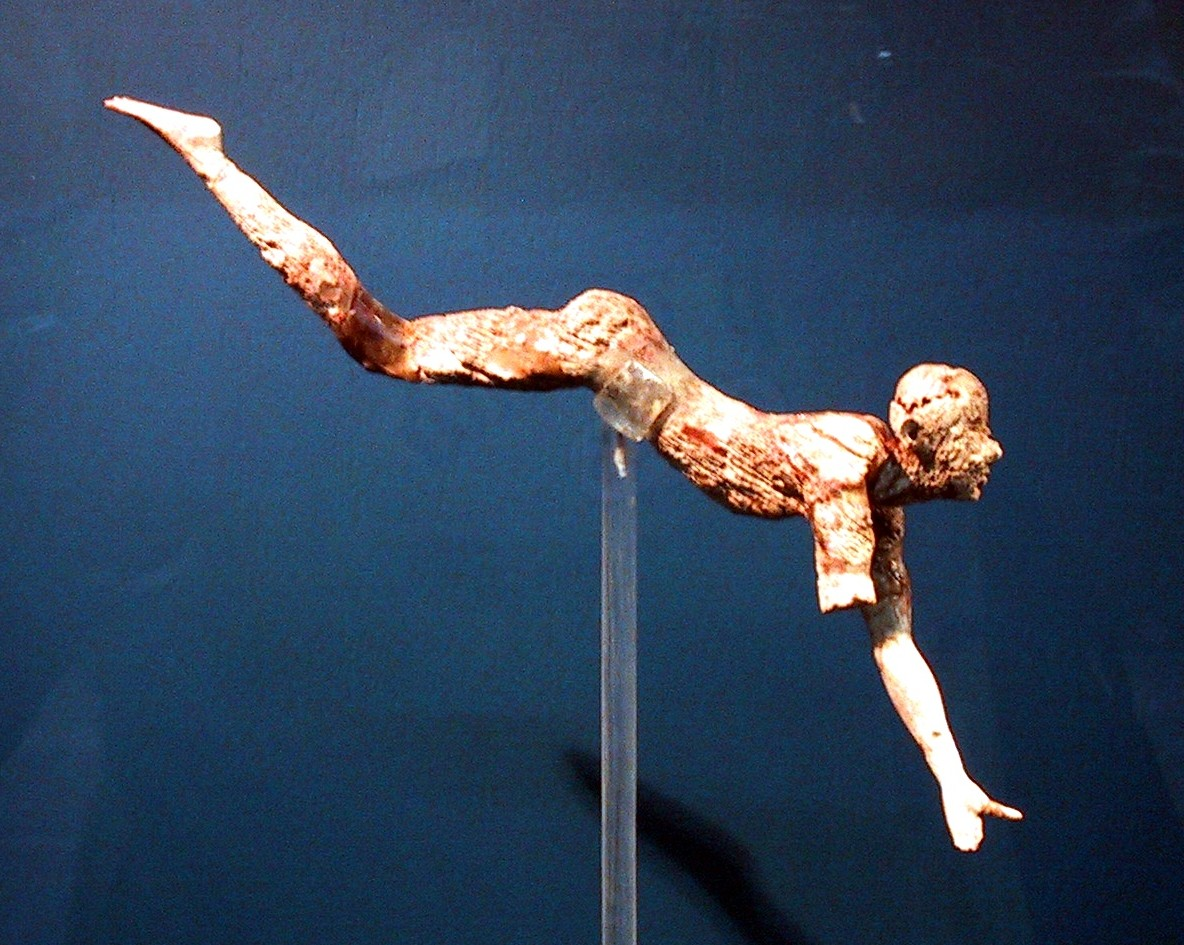
The Bull Leaper, an ivory figurine from the palace of Knossos, Crete, 1500 BC

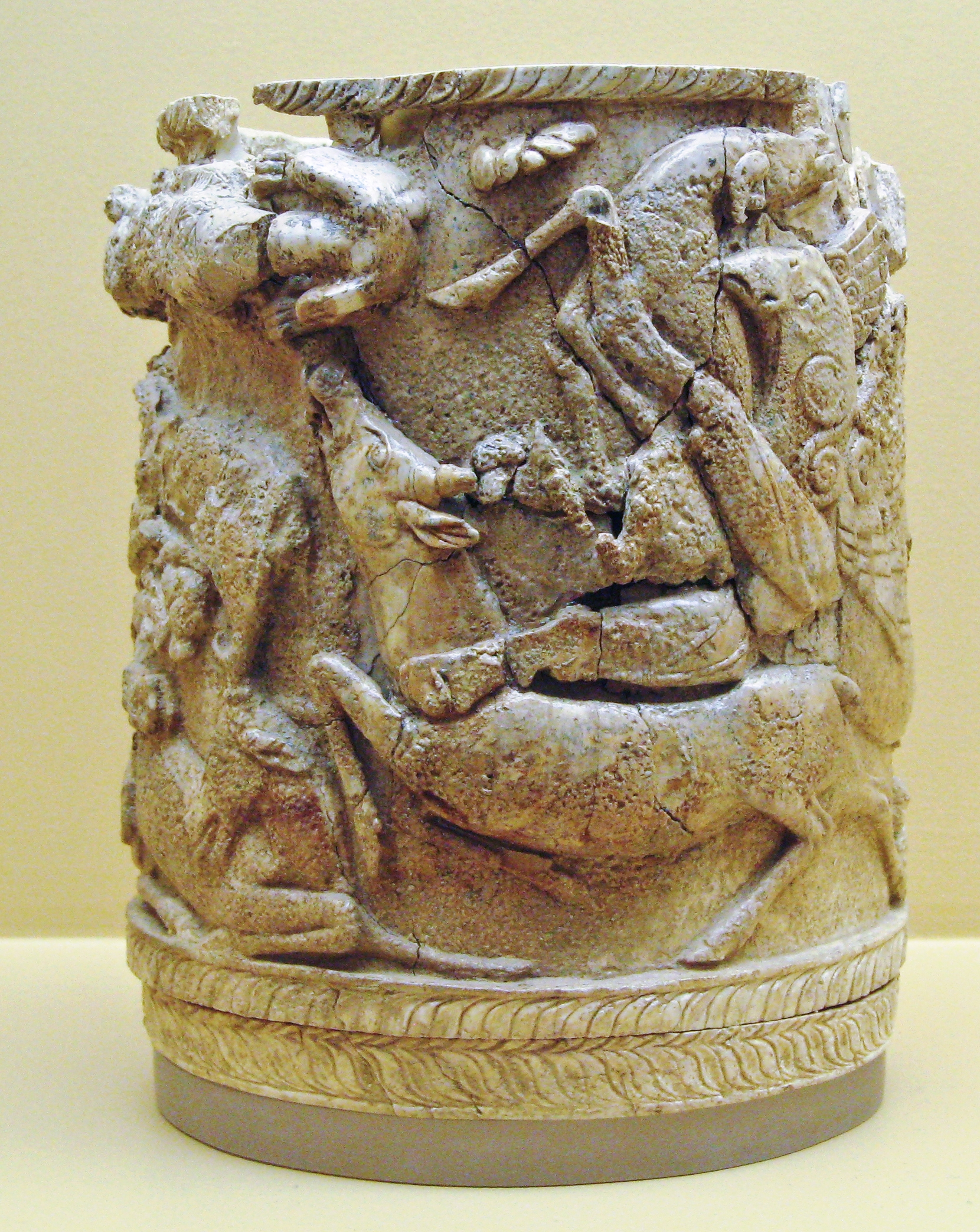
Ancient Greek ivory pyxis with griffins attacking stags. Late 15th century BC

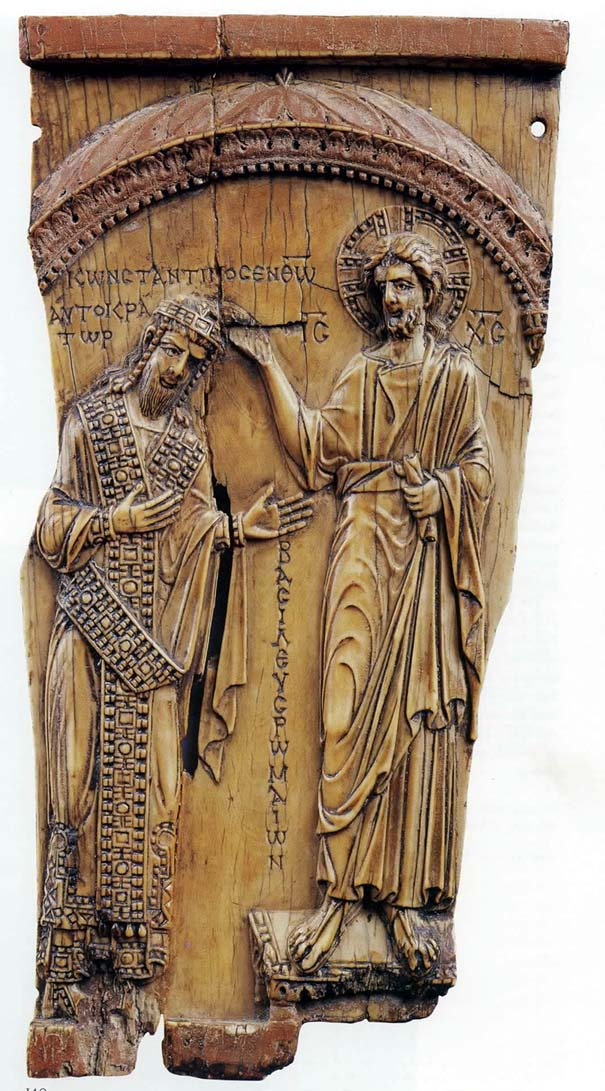
A piece of carved ivory from the Pushkin Museum representing Christ blessing Emperor Constantine VII. Mid 10th century AD

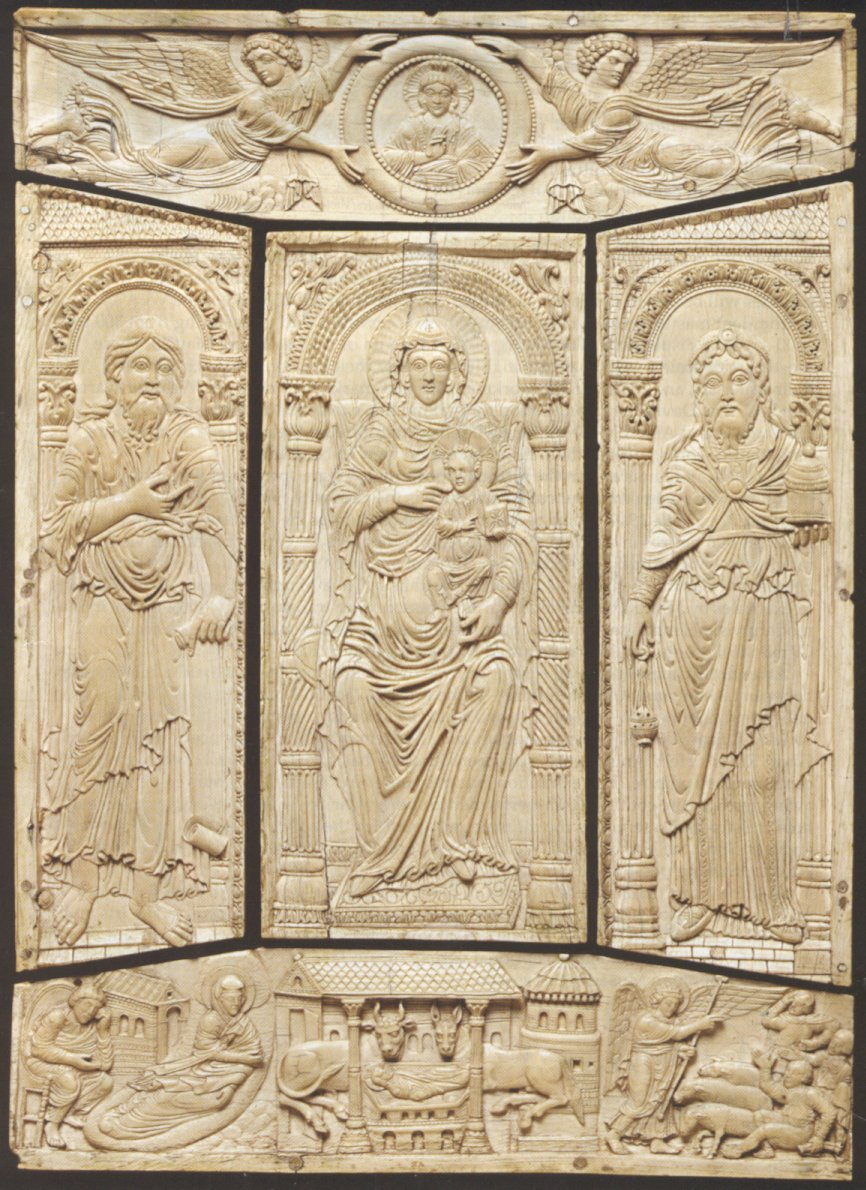
Ivory cover of the Codex Aureus of Lorsch, c. 810, Carolingian dynasty, Victoria and Albert Museum

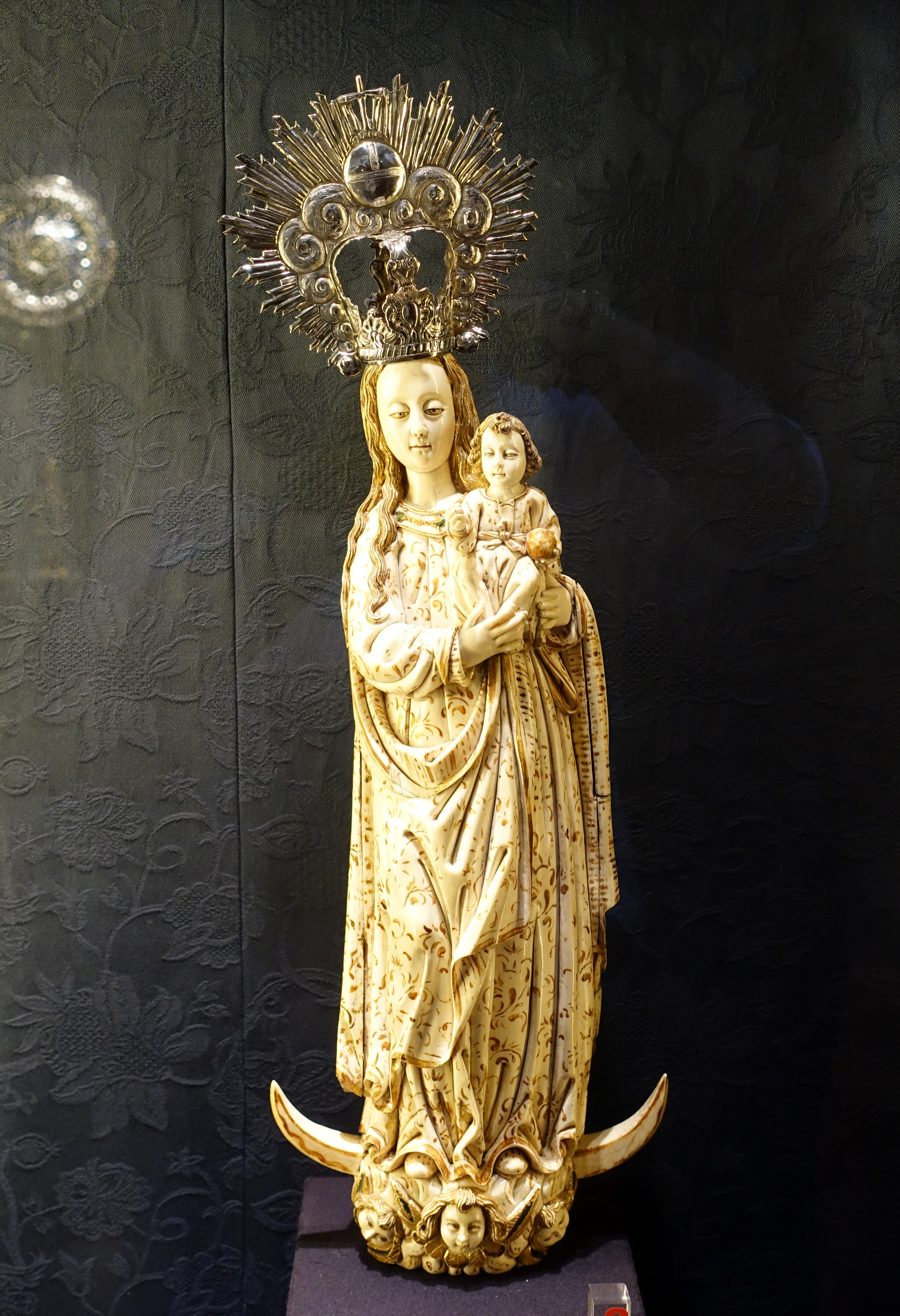
Madonna with Child from the Philippines, 1600s

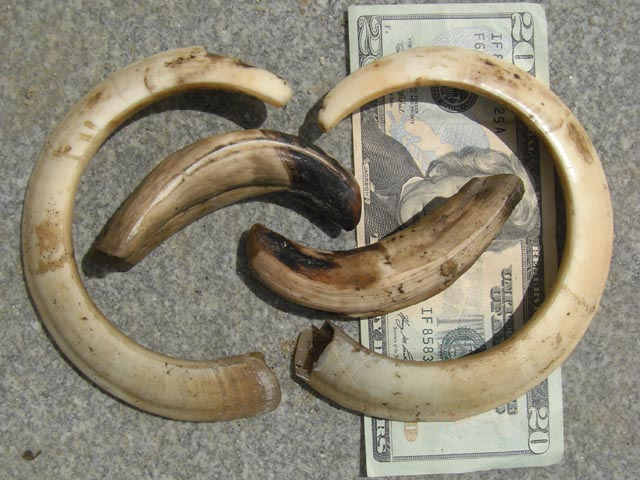
Pig tusks

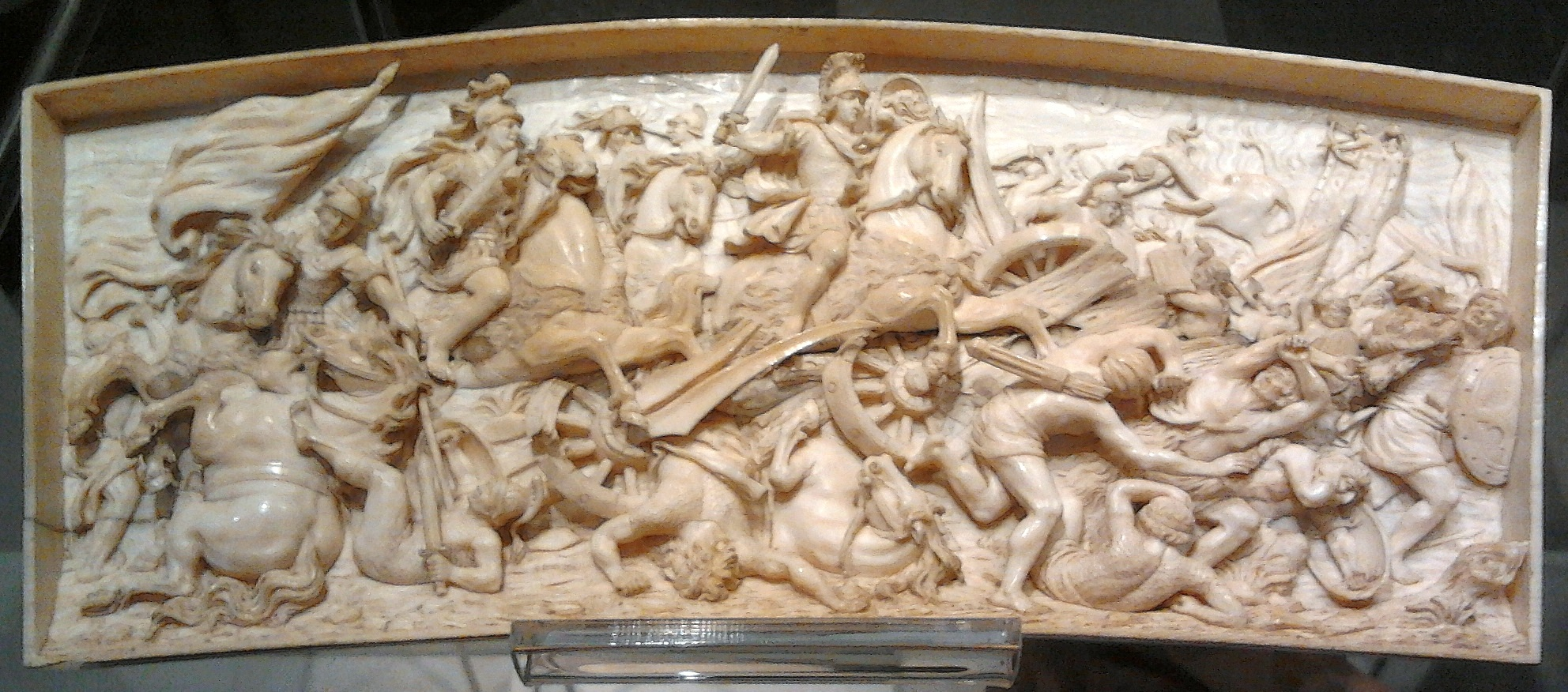
Battle of Hannibal and Scipio (Alexander's victory over Poros), by Ignaz Elhafen, c. 1700, Warsaw Royal Castle

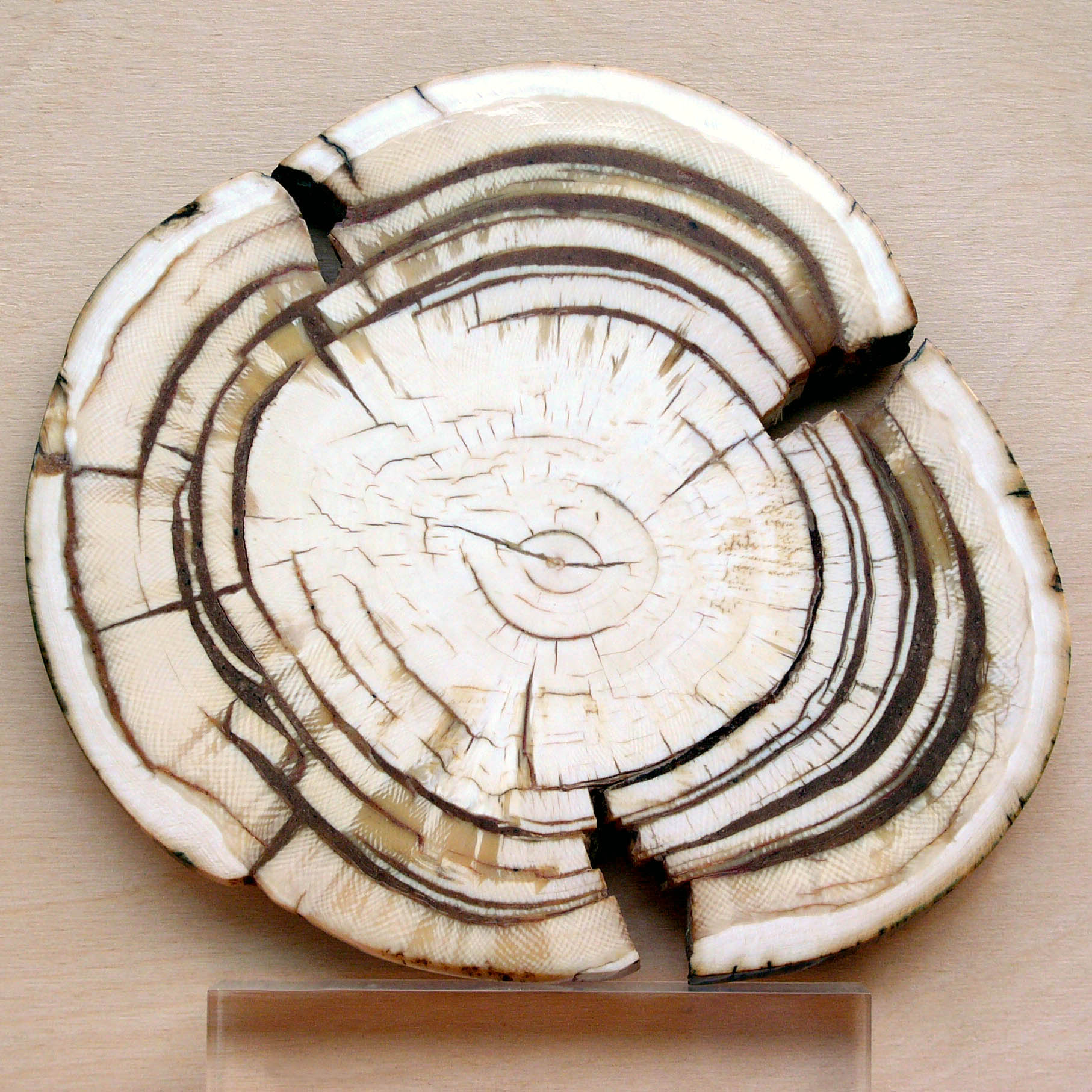
Section through the ivory tusk of a mammoth

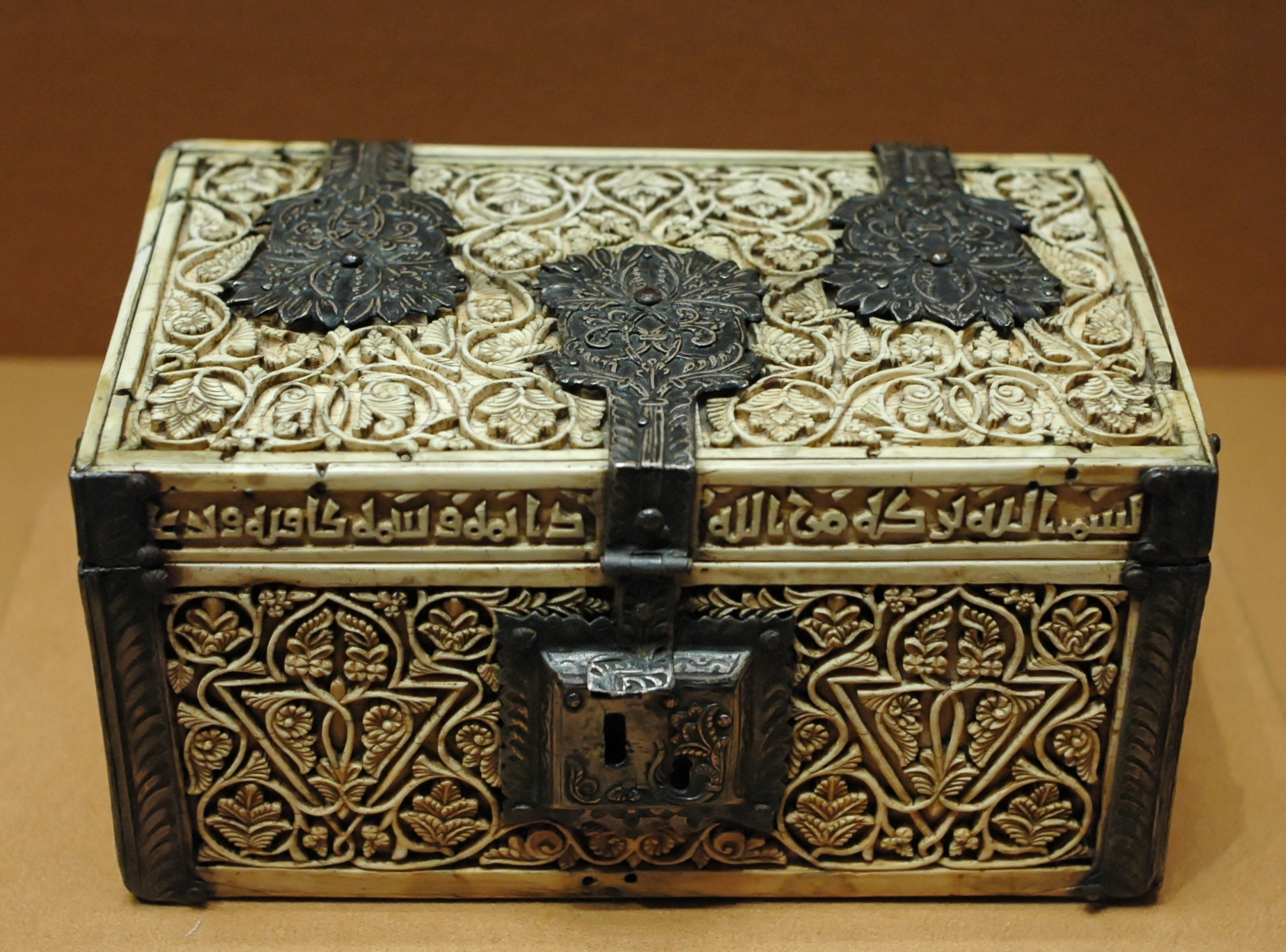
Casket, ivory and silver, Caliphate of Córdoba, 966

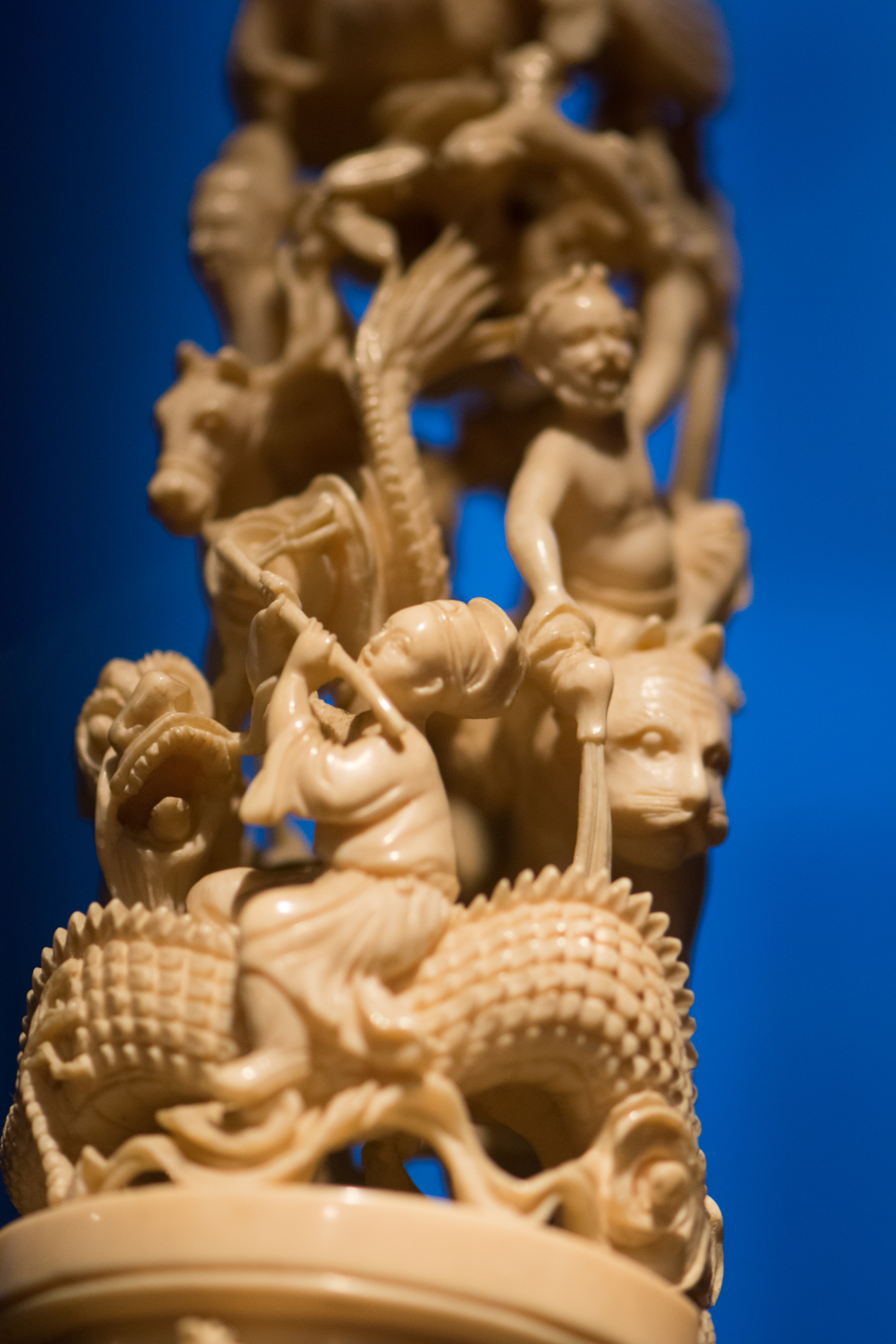
Carving from Indonesia

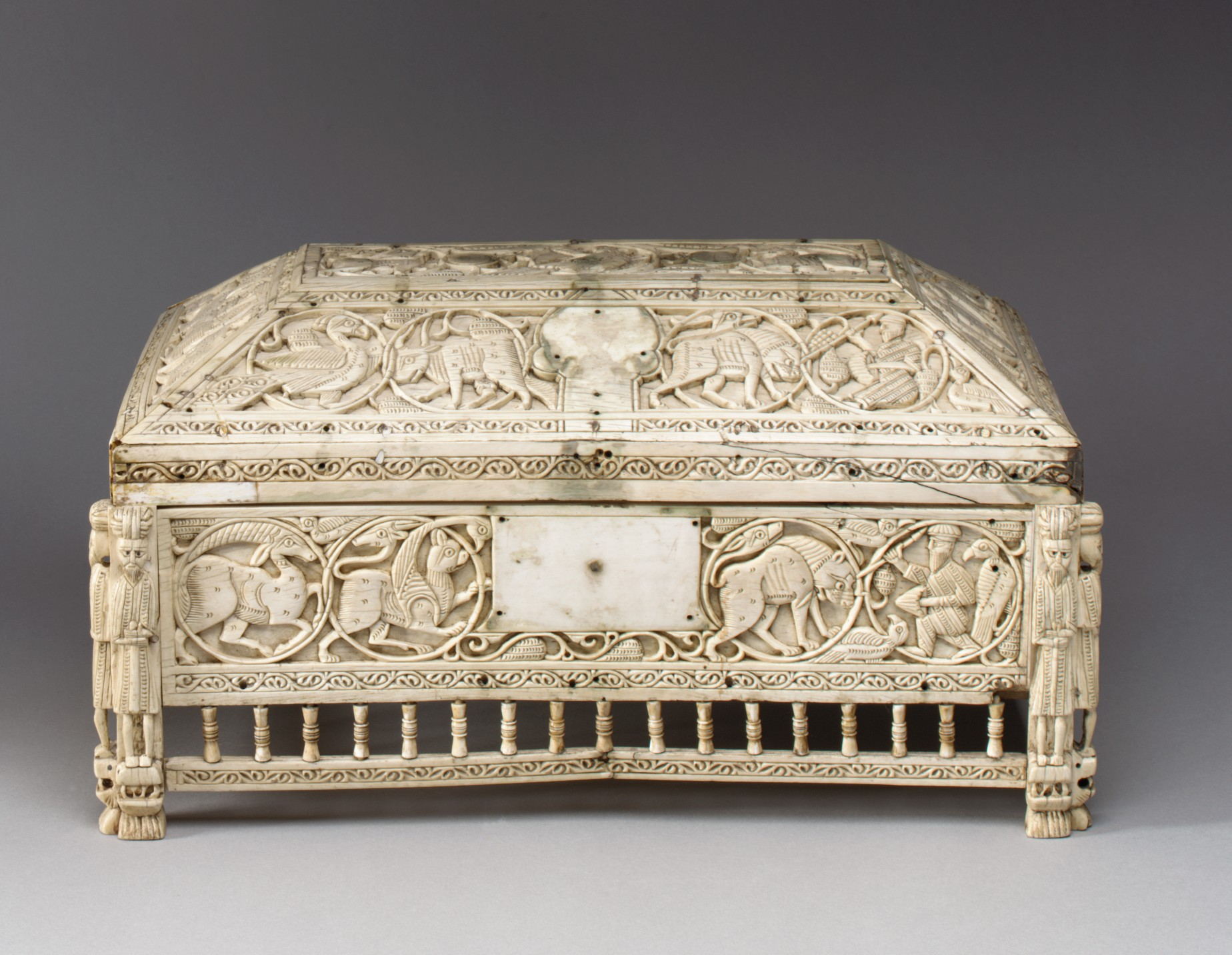
The Morgan Casket, an 11th-century ivory casket attributed to Southern Italy, currently in the collection of the Metropolitan Museum of Art

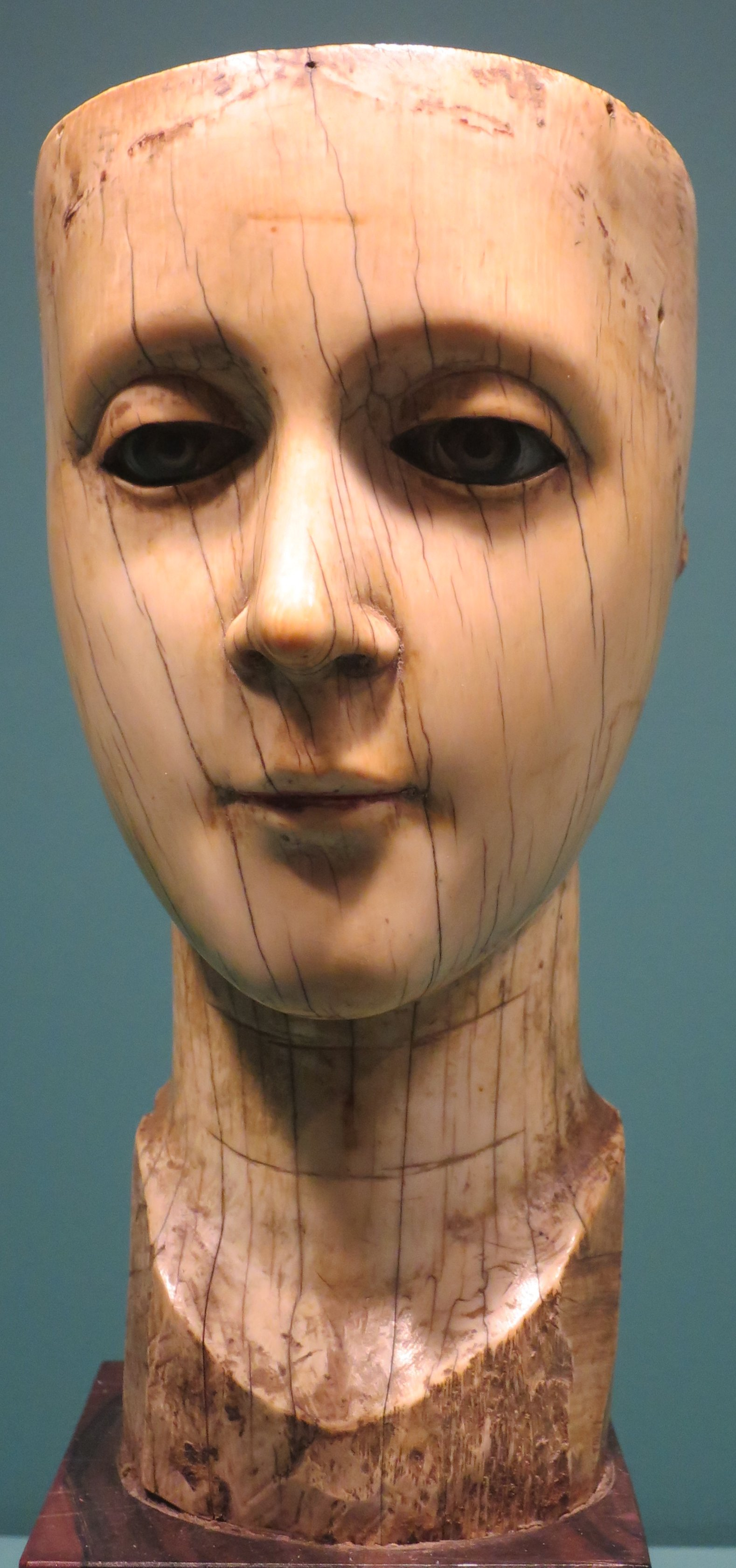
Virgin Mary head from the Philippines, 18th–19th century

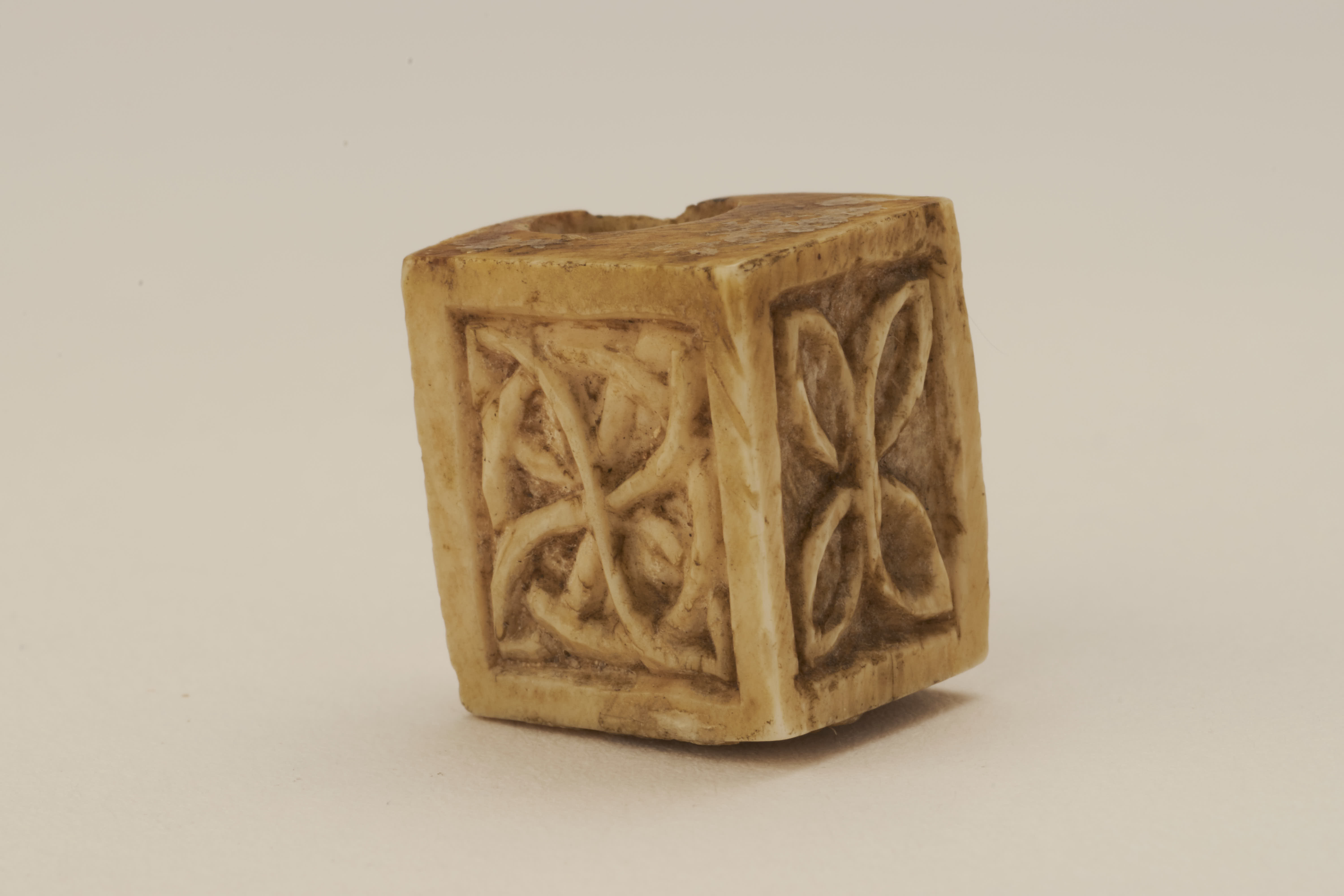
A cubical ivory bead or game piece from the collections of the Hunt Museum

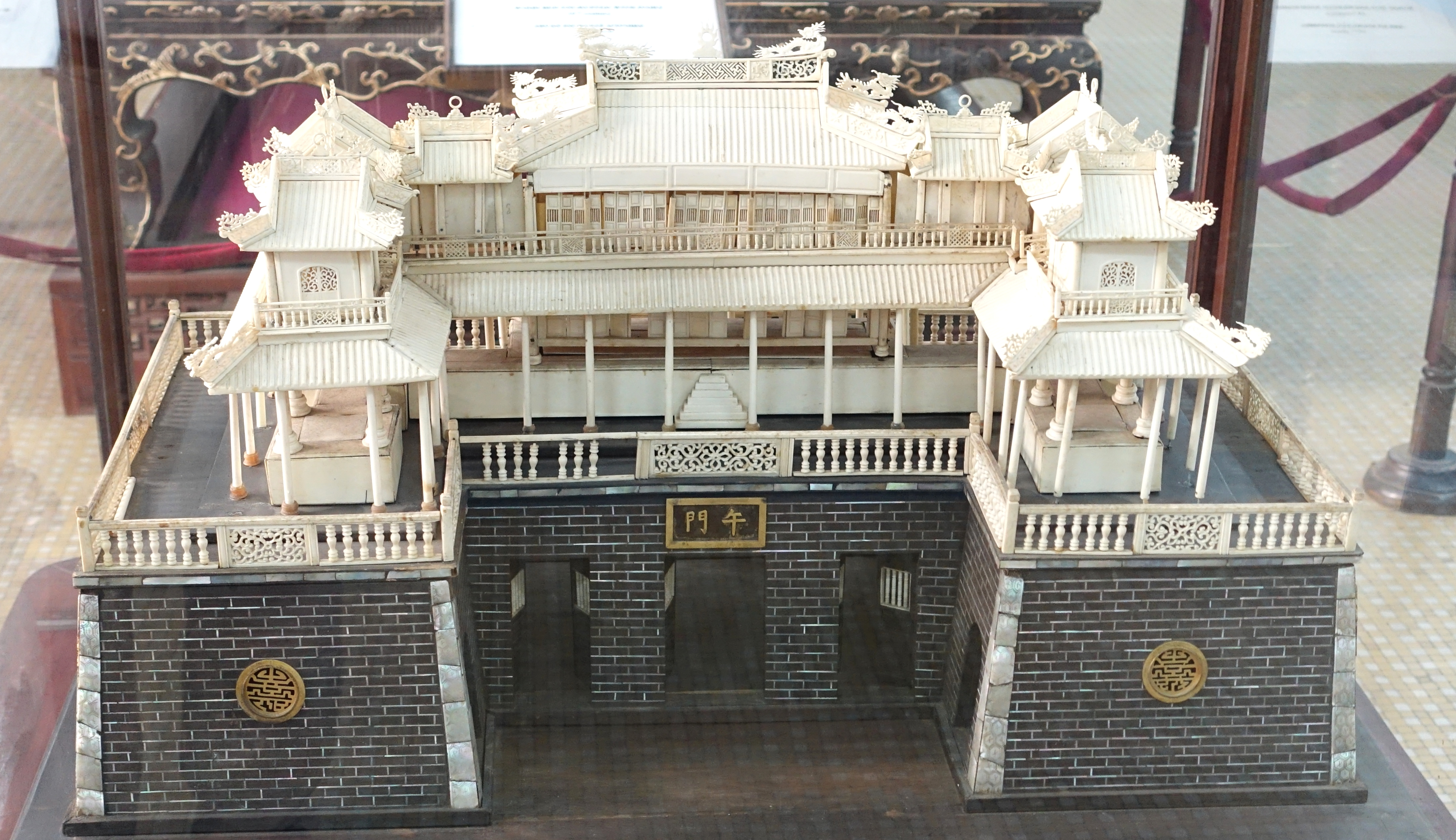
Ngọ Môn ivory model from Vietnam

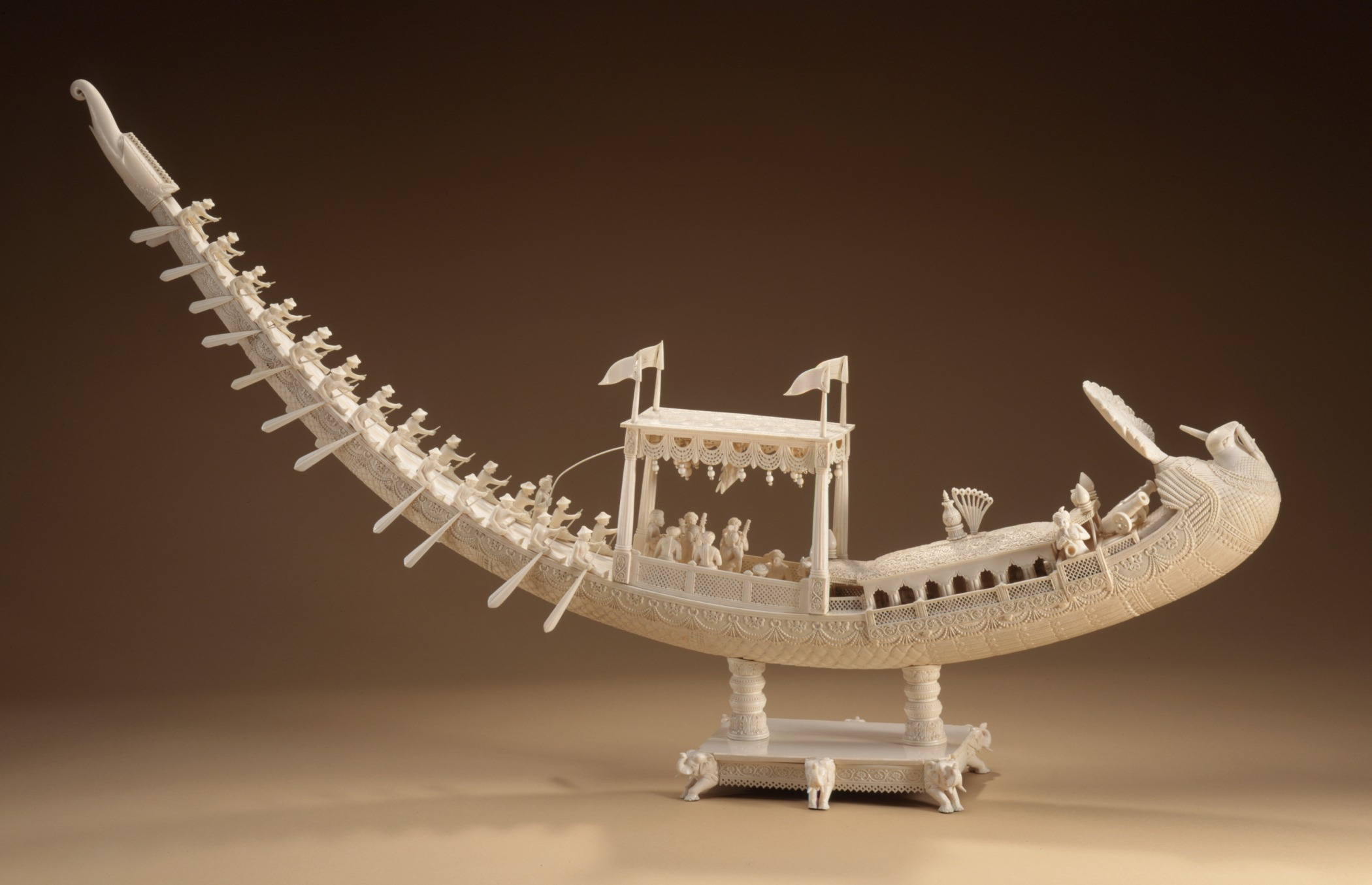
A carved ivory barge from Murshidabad, India

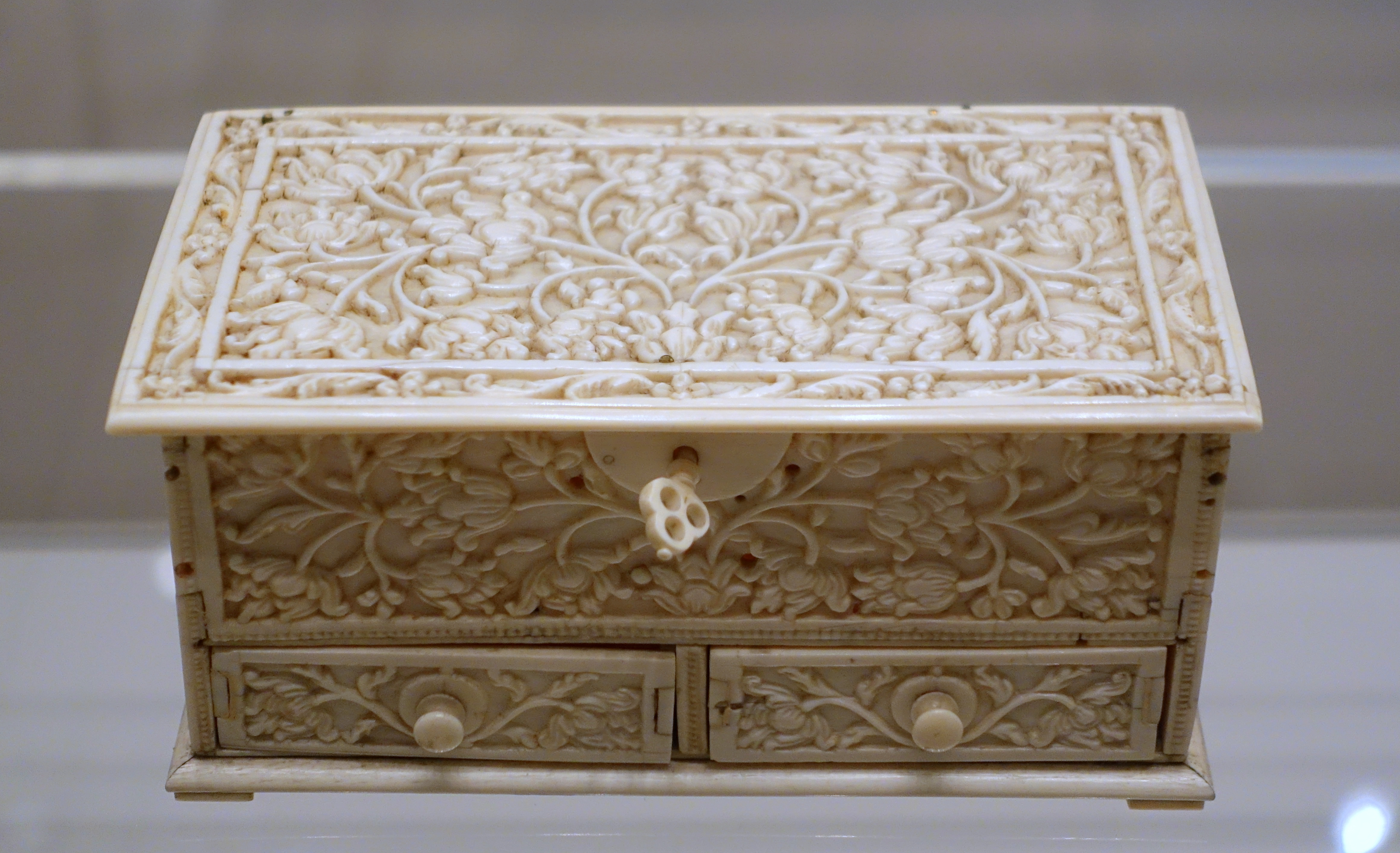
Ivory casket with two drawers, North India

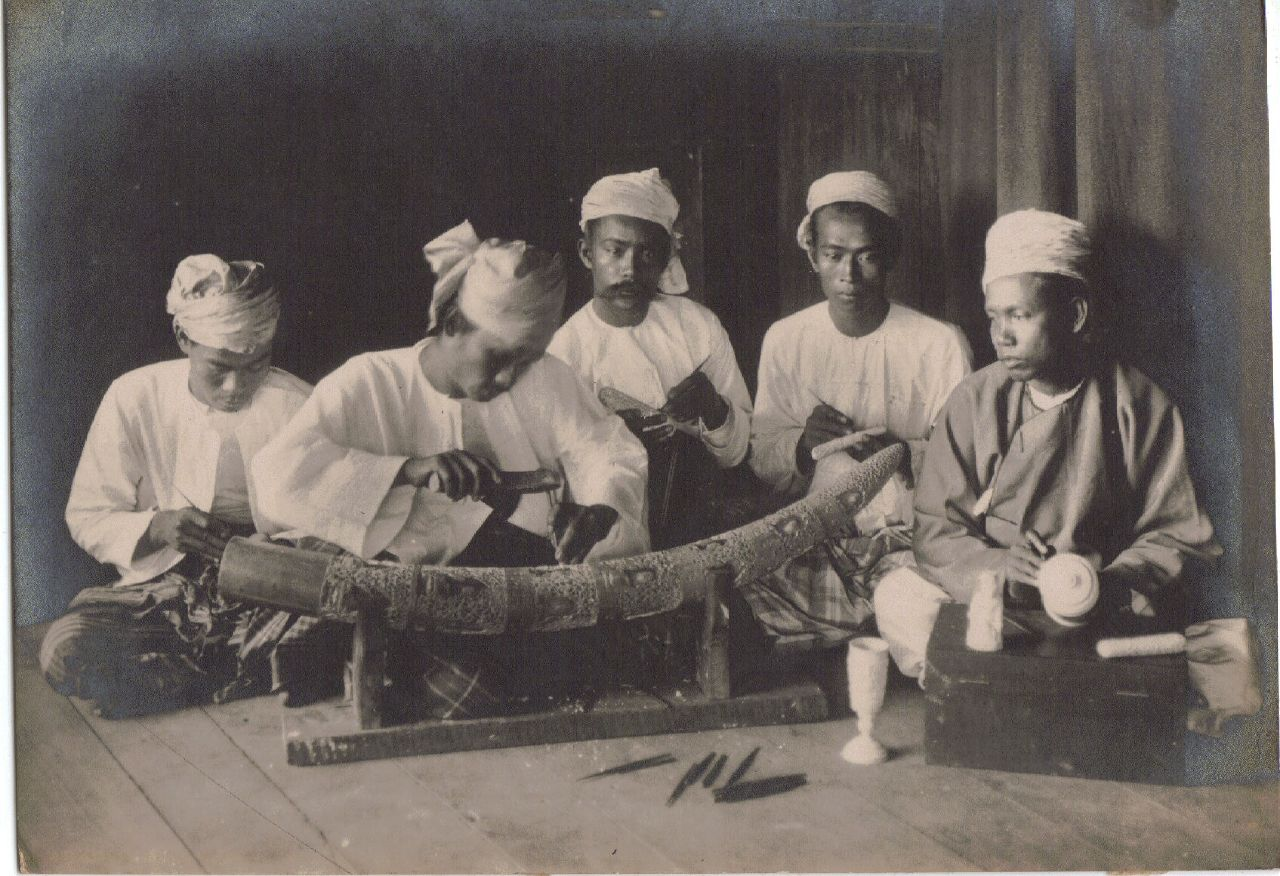
Ivory workers in Calcutta, c. 1903

== See also ==
- Biobased economy
- Ivory tower
- Jim Nyamu
- RAL 1014 Ivory
- Schreger line
