= Schreger line =

Visual artifacts in ivory cross-sections

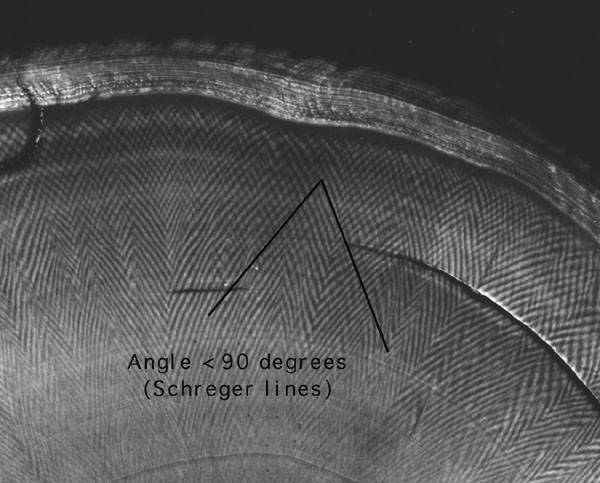
Schreger lines in mammoth ivory

Schreger lines are visual artifacts that are evident in the cross-sections of ivory. They are commonly referred to as cross-hatchings, engine turnings, or stacked chevrons. Schreger lines can be divided into two categories. The easily seen lines which are closest to the cementum are the outer Schreger lines. The faintly discernible lines found around the tusk nerve or pulp cavities are the inner Schreger lines. The intersections of Schreger lines form angles, which appear in two forms: concave angles and convex angle. Concave angles have slightly concave sides and open to the medial (inner) area of the tusk. Convex angles have somewhat convex sides and open to the lateral (outer) area of the tusk. Outer Schreger angles, both concave and convex, are acute in extinct proboscidea and obtuse in extant proboscidea.
