= Untermyer =

Untermyer or Untermaier may refer to:

- Untermyer Fountain, in Manhattan, New York
- Untermyer Park and Gardens, in Yonkers, New York

== People with the surname ==
- Cécile Untermaier (born 1951), French politician and civil servant
- Irwin Untermyer (1886-1973), American jurist, civic leader, and patron of the arts
- Samuel Untermyer (1858–1940), American Zionist, lawyer, civic leader and millionaire
- Samuel Untermyer II (1912–2001), United States nuclear scientist

== See also ==
- Untermeyer (disambiguation)
