= Irwin Untermyer =

American attorney and civic leader

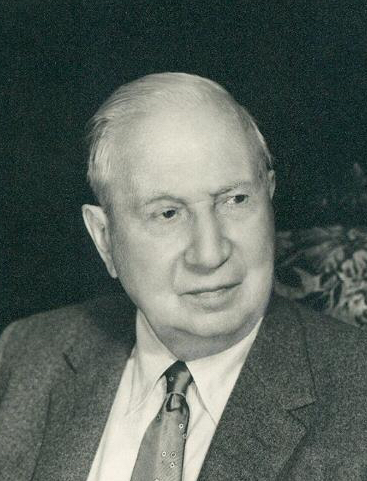
- Born: February 2, 1886
- Died: October 18, 1973 (aged 87); New York City, US
- Education: Columbia University (BA, LLB)
- Occupations: Attorney; Judge
- Spouse: Louise Feuchtwanger
- Children: 3, including Samuel Untermyer II
- Parent(s): Samuel Untermyer, Minnie Carl

Irwin Untermyer (February 2, 1886 – October 18, 1973) was an American attorney, jurist, and civic leader most notable for his work in New York City. He was the son of Samuel Untermyer, another notable New York attorney who is best remembered for his opposition to Adolf Hitler and for creating Untermyer Park and Gardens, "America's Greatest Forgotten Garden" in Yonkers, New York. Irwin was also the father of Samuel Untermyer II, a notable nuclear scientist.

== Legal career ==
Irwin Untermyer graduated from Columbia University in 1907 and Columbia Law School in 1910. Following graduation, Untermyer proceeded to his father's law firm, Guggenheimer, Untermyer & Marshall, where he became partner. "It has rarely fallen to the lot of those elected to the bench to have enjoyed the rich experience of Mr. Untermyer," wrote Louis Marshall in The New York Times.

Along with his father, Untermyer also served as volunteer special counsel for the city's Transit Commission. As a result, he had to make oral arguments before the United States Supreme Court in Gilchrist v. Interborough Rapid Transit Company.

The Interborough Rapid Transit Company wanted to raise the New York City Subway's five-cent fare, and the city was suing to prevent that. Irwin's father was originally scheduled to represent the city, but when he fell ill Irwin argued before Chief Justice Taft and his fellow justices for nearly two hours. "There were only three interruptions, two of them being requests for page numbers in the brief", The New York Times wrote.

The Court held in favor of the City. "I am very happy to hear of the decision", then-Congressman Fiorello La Guardia stated, calling Untermyer's argument a "splendid and merited rebuke to the judges who lost their heads in New York and signed the order." Among the judges who had “lost their heads” was the notorious Martin T. Manton, who was ultimately revealed to have accepted bribes (in the form of “loans”) from those interested in the case. A decade later, Manton would be forced to resign his position and was ultimately convicted of conspiracy for his wide-ranging pattern of corruption.

Untermyer was elected to the New York Supreme Court, the trial court of New York state, in 1929 with the backing of Tammany Hall mayor Jimmy Walker. In 1933, Governor Herbert H. Lehman designated Untermyer as a justice of the Appellate Division of the New York Supreme Court, First Judicial Department, where he served alongside Justices that included Roy Cohn’s father Albert until Untermyer's retirement in August 1945. Although long active in Democratic Party politics, Untermyer received the endorsement of all political parties during his reelection bid in 1943.

== Metropolitan Museum of Art ==
Though he followed in his father Samuel's legal footsteps, Irwin did not share his father's passion for promoting public horticulture at Untermyer Park in Westchester County, New York. "Mr. Untermyer’s sons, Alvin Untermyer and Judge Irwin Untermyer, have not inherited their father’s costly passion for home-grown orchid boutonnieres, hothouse figs, nectarines, etc," wrote The New Yorker in 1940.

Instead, Untermyer became known as an avid collector and promoter of art and antiquities. Untermyer donated extensively to the Metropolitan Museum of Art in New York City and maintained a lifelong association with the museum. He served on the Board of Trustees for 20 years, and bequeathed over 2,000 pieces from his collection upon his death. Pieces donated by Untermyer constitute "one of the world's great private collections" and are on permanent display in the museum.

Untermyer's collection in the Metropolitan Museum is mentioned in E. L. Konigsburg's 1967 book From the Mixed-Up Files of Mrs. Basil E. Frankweiler. While living at the Met, the Kincaid siblings sleep in an antique four-poster bed from the Irwin Untermyer collection. "I once considered donating [the museum] my bed," says the book's narrator, Mrs. Frankweiler, "but Mr. Untermyer gave them this one first."

== Private life ==
Untermyer married Louise A. Feuchtwanger on February 15, 1912, at the St. Regis New York. The couple had three children, Joan Untermyer Erdmann, Samuel Untermyer II, and Frank Untermyer.

Irwin Untermyer died on October 18, 1973, at the age of 87. He is interred at the Untermyer Family Plot at Woodlawn Cemetery in the Bronx, which features extensive bronzework by Gertrude Vanderbilt Whitney.
