= Samuel Untermyer II =

- Born: November 25, 1912
- Died: January 26, 2001 (aged 88)
- Known for: Contributions to the development of the Boiling water reactor
- Parent: Irwin Untermyer
- Relatives: Samuel Untermyer (grandfather)
- Awards: Newcomen Medal
- Scientific career
- Fields: Nuclear physics

Samuel Untermyer II (25 November 1912 – 26 January 2001) was an American nuclear scientist. He was the son of notable New York City jurist Irwin Untermyer and grandson of attorney Samuel Untermyer.

Samuel Untermyer II theorized that steam bubble formation in a nuclear reactor core would not produce unstable reactions, but would instead result in an inherently stable and self-controlling reactor design. This was eventually proved in the BORAX experiments, which led to the design of the Boiling water reactor. In recognition of his fundamental development work on water-cooled reactors, the American Nuclear Society now has an award named after him for work in this field.

Untermyer was awarded the Newcomen Medal in 1980.
