= Untermeyer =

Untermeyer is a surname. Notable people with the surname include:

- Chase Untermeyer (born 1946), former United States ambassador to Qatar
- Jean Starr Untermeyer (1886–1970), American poet, translator, and educator
- Louis Untermeyer (1885–1977), American poet, anthologist, critic, and editor
  - Bryna Ivens Untermeyer (1909–1985) wife of Louis Untermeyer
  - Esther Antin Untermeyer (died 1983), wife of Louis Untermeyer

== See also ==
- Untermyer (disambiguation)
