= Samuel Untermyer =

American lawyer and civic leader (1858–1940)

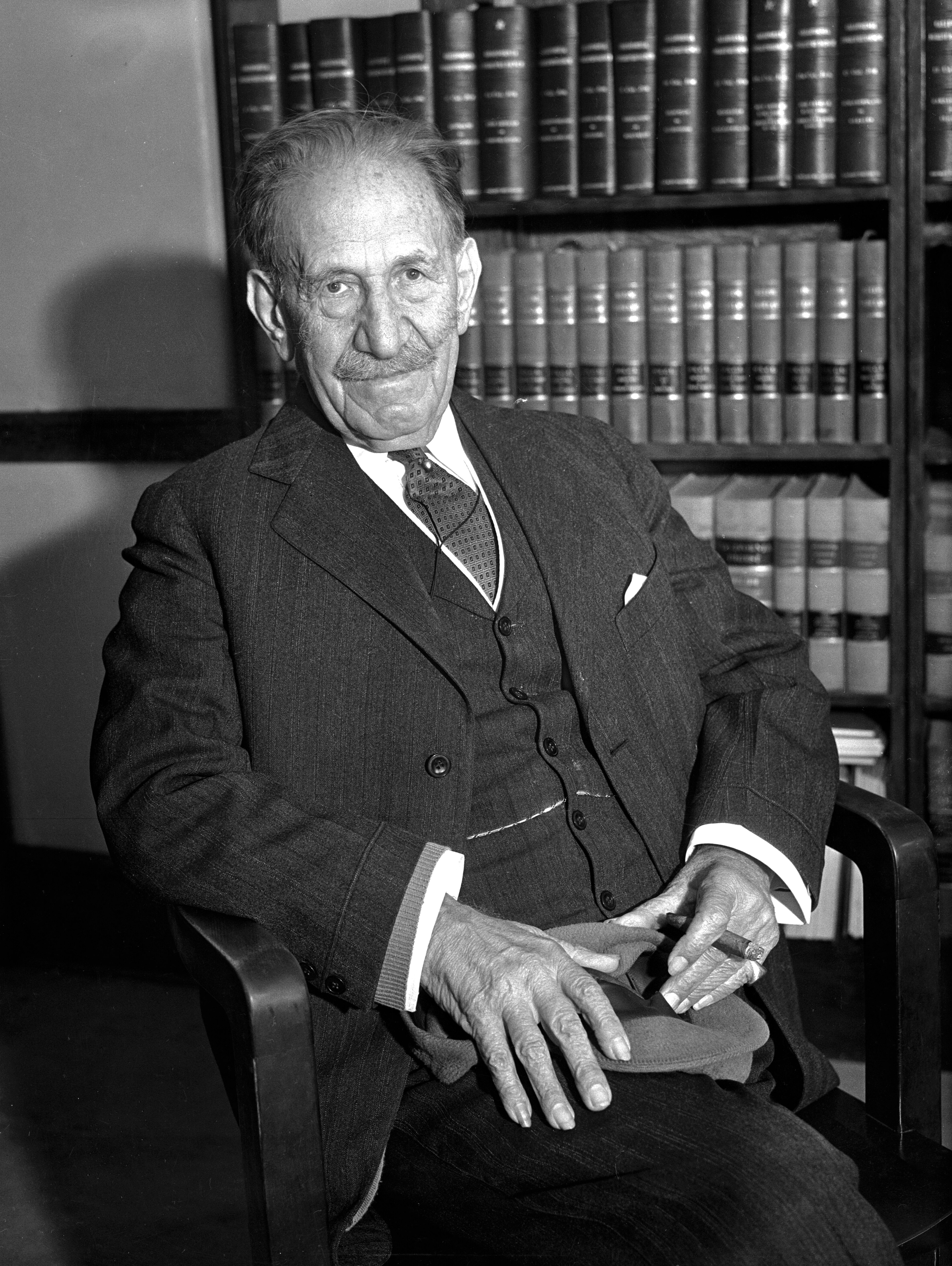
- Samuel Untermyer, 1935
- Born: March 6, 1858; Lynchburg, Virginia, US
- Died: March 16, 1940 (aged 82); Palm Springs, California, US
- Education: City College of New York (BA); Columbia University (LLB)
- Occupation: Corporate lawyer
- Known for: Civic activism
- Spouse: Minnie Carl (m. 1880)
- Children: 3, including Irwin Untermyer

Samuel Untermyer (March 6, 1858 (Note: Although some sources cite March 2, 1858, and even others, June 6, 1858) – March 16, 1940) was a prominent American lawyer and civic leader. He is also remembered for bequeathing his Yonkers, New York estate, now known as Untermyer Park, to the people of New York State.

== Life ==
Samuel Untermyer was born in Lynchburg, Virginia to Isadore Untermyer (Yiddish: איזאַדאָרע ינטערמייער) and Therese Landauer (Yiddish: טהערעסע לאַנדאַוער ונטערמעיער), both of whom were German Jews who emigrated to the United States from Bavaria. His father, a planter, served as a lieutenant in the Confederate States Army. Following his death in 1866, the family moved to New York City.

He began his higher education at the City College of New York before receiving his LL.B. from Columbia University in 1878.

Following his admission to the bar, Untermyer started practicing in New York City. His younger brother, Maurice Untermyer, was later admitted, while he also recruited Columbia classmate Louis Marshall to join the firm in 1895. They, with Randolph Guggenheimer and his descendants, practiced as Guggenheimer, Untermyer & Marshall for 45 years.

Untermyer gained fame as a lawyer focusing on corporate law. An exponent of the Progressive Era, he became an advocate of stock market regulations, government ownership of railroads and various legal reforms. He was also the first attorney to earn a million dollars on a single case.

== Career ==
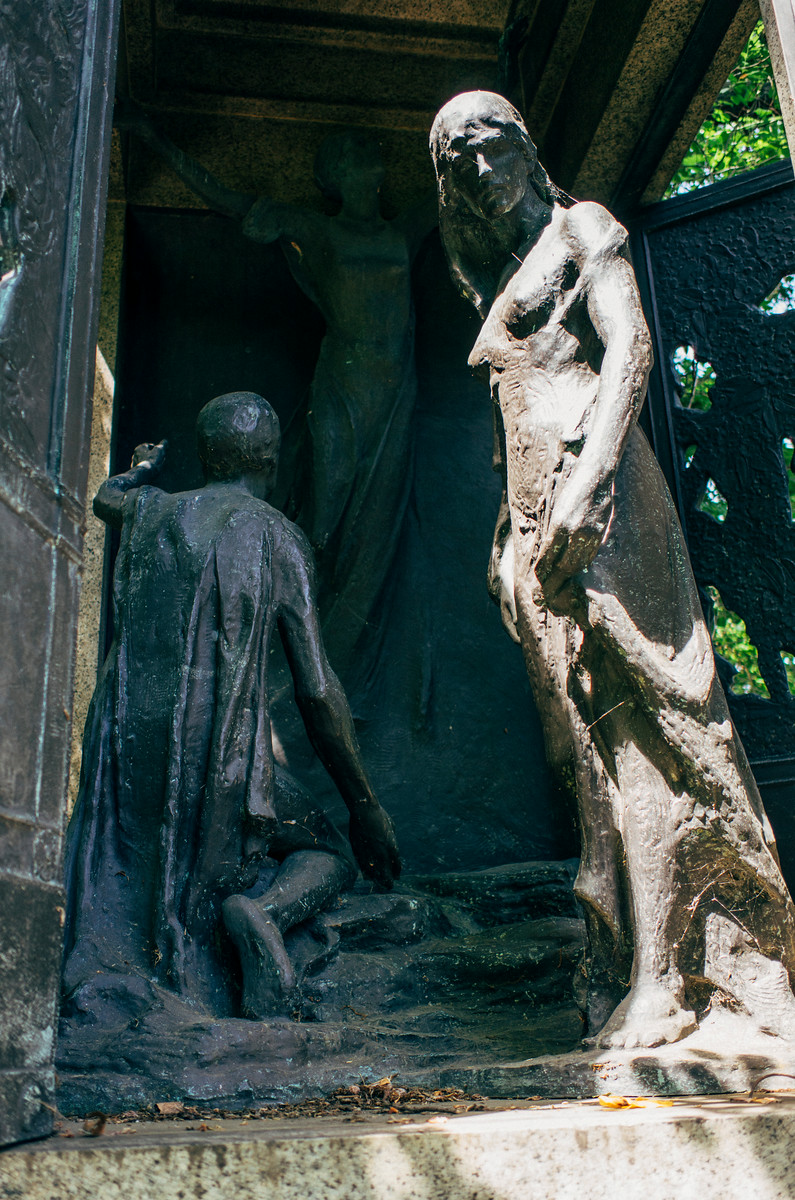
Interior of Samuel Untermyer's tomb at Woodlawn Cemetery, Bronx NY

Between the start of his practice and 1921, Untermyer was counsel in many celebrated cases, specifically:

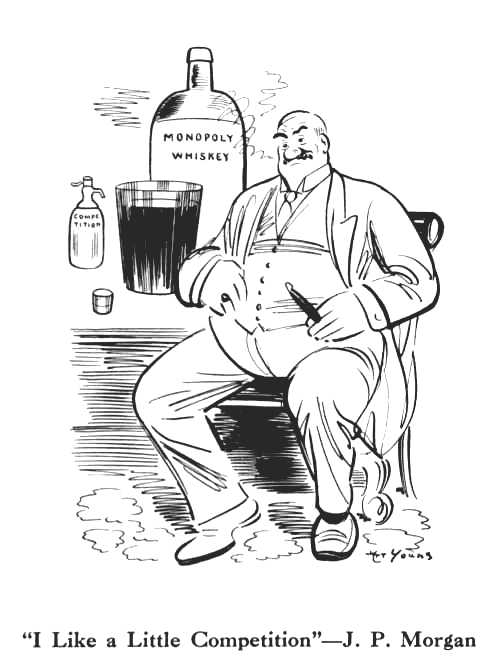
"I Like a Little Competition" – J. P. Morgan by Art Young. Cartoon relating to one of J. P. Morgan's replies to Untermyer at the Pujo Committee.

- As counsel for H. Clay Pierce, he prevented Standard Oil from dominating the Waters-Pierce after its dissolution in 1910.
- In the same year, he facilitated the merger of Utah Copper with Boston Consolidated and the Nevada Consolidated, a case that involved more than $100,000,000.
- In 1912, as counsel to the Kaliwerke Aschersleben and the Disconte Gesellschaft in the controversy arising out of the control of the potash industry by the German government, he assisted in reaching a settlement.
- In 1903, he undertook the first judicial exposure of "high finance" in connection with the failure of U.S. Shipbuilding, organized only a year before as a consolidation of the larger shipbuilding companies in America, including the entity subsequently known as Bethlehem Steel. As a result of the sensational exposures connected with that company, a reorganization was effected under the name of Bethlehem Steel, in which Untermyer became a large shareholder.
- After this he conducted a number of similar exposures. In 1911 he delivered "Is There a Money Trust?", an address that prompted an investigation by the Committee on Banking and Currency of the U.S. House of Representatives, then headed by Arsène Pujo. Untermyer was counsel-investigator to the Pujo Committee, famously cross-examining J. P. Morgan and other New York bankers. The Committee's work resulted in the passage of remedial legislation, including the establishment of the Federal Reserve System.
- Untermyer for years agitated before Congress and state legislatures such measures as the compulsory regulation of stock exchanges.
- He for many years conducted agitations and wrote magazine articles dealing with reforms in criminal law, the regulation of trusts and combinations and other economic subjects.
- He was counsel for many reorganization committees, including those of the Seaboard Air Line Railroad, the Rock Island Railroad, Central Fuel Oil, and Southern Iron and Steel.
- In 1915, he acted as a counsel for the federal government in the suit brought against the Secretary of the Treasury and the Comptroller of the Currency by the Riggs National Bank of Washington, D.C., which charged there was a conspiracy to wreck it; the defendants were cleared.
- He took an active part in preparing the Federal Reserve Act, the Clayton Antitrust Act of 1914, the Federal Trade Commission Act of 1914 and other legislation curbing trusts.
- He was a delegate to the Democratic National Convention in 1904, 1908 and 1912; and delegate-at-large for the state of New York in 1916. Accordingly, he was a strong supporter of Woodrow Wilson's administration.
- After America entered World War I, he was an advisor to the U.S. Treasury Department regarding the interpretation of the income tax and the excess profits tax laws.
- He was appointed by President Wilson to serve on the U.S. section of the 1916 International High Commission, which convened in Buenos Aires for the purpose of framing uniform laws in the Americas.

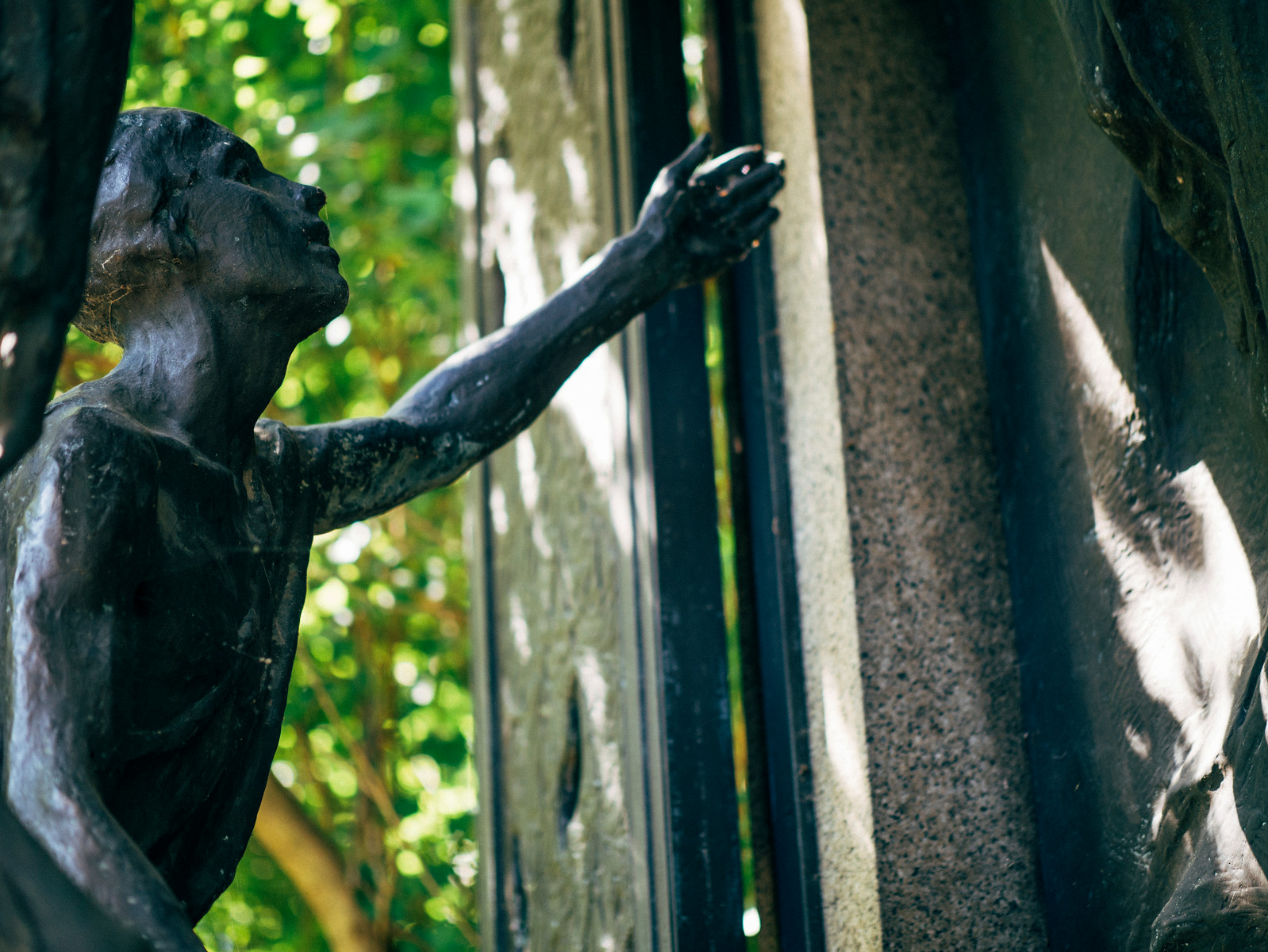
Detail of Samuel Untermyer's tomb at Woodlawn Cemetery, Bronx NY

- In 1920, he was counsel for a joint committee of the New York state legislature (popularly known as the Lockwood Committee) appointed to investigate an alleged conspiracy among the building trades of New York City. It was charged that labor leaders were using their power by extorting bribes for the prevention of strikes, by preventing independent bids and by forcing building awards to favorites. Many illegal acts were disclosed and numerous convictions secured. Robert P. Brindell, who was at the head of the labor council of the building trades with a membership of 115,000, was prosecuted by Untermyer, who conducted the case in person as a special attorney general, and convicted of extortion and sentenced to five-to-ten years in state prison. At the end of 1921, when the prosecutions were being continued, more than 600 indictments had been found as a result of the investigation and many more were said to be pending. There were more than 200 convictions including pleas of guilty by employers, labor leaders and others and over $500,000 had been collected in fines. In connection with the exposure of abuses and acts of illegality among the labour unions, all unions in the state were required, under the threat of criminal prosecution and of submitting to incorporation, to amend their constitutions and bylaws by eliminating these abuses; this they all agreed to do. It was shown that in many of the building trades both manufacturers and dealers, often with the collusive aid of labour leaders, had organized to fix prices and prevent competition. Subsequent prosecutions established the fact that these and other unfair practices were an important element in preventing building operations and increasing rental charges for dwelling properties. Public opinion, especially in view of the housing shortage, reacted sharply to these revelations, and it was felt that Untermyer's work in this connection had been performed with admirable public spirit, energy and courage. It was generally believed, moreover, that the evils brought to light by the committee were not confined to New York, and a demand for similar investigations arose in other parts of the country.
- As special counsel until 1933 in the New York City transit suits, he helped maintain the five-cent subway fare.

== Political involvement ==
Untermyer later served as a delegate to the Democratic National Convention from New York in 1932 and 1936. He was also a delegate to the New York Constitutional Convention in 1938.

Untermyer also identified as a Zionist and served as president of the Keren Hayesod, an agency through which the movement was then and still is conducted in the United States.

In 1933, he helped found the Non-Sectarian Anti-Nazi League to promote an economic boycott of Nazi Germany.

== Untermyer Park ==
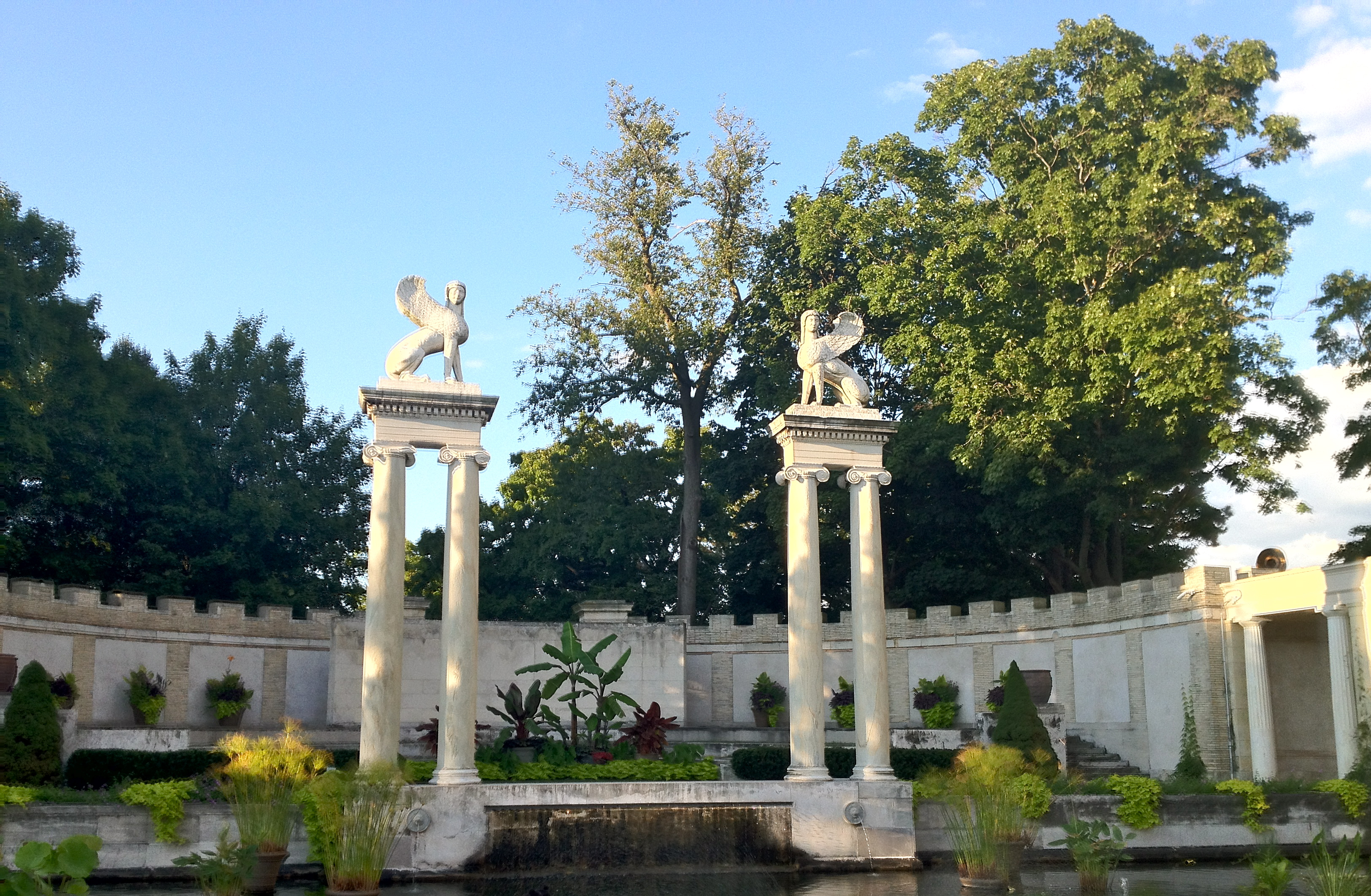
Part of Untermyer Park, the former estate of Samuel Untermyer

Untermyer developed elaborate gardens at his primary residence, Greystone, in Yonkers, New York. The 150-acre estate was situated on land adjacent to the Hudson River. Greystone had previously been owned by Samuel J. Tilden, the 25th Governor of New York and the Democratic presidential nominee in the disputed election of 1876. Untermyer, who purchased the estate shortly after Tilden's death in 1886, willed it to the federal, state or Yonkers municipal government to benefit the public. Eventually, the city agreed to accept part of the estate gardens; this parcel of land was renamed Untermyer Park in his honor. It was added to the National Register of Historic Places in 1974.

Untermyer Gardens have undergone significant restorations, which are continuing, to recreate the original design.

== Personal life ==
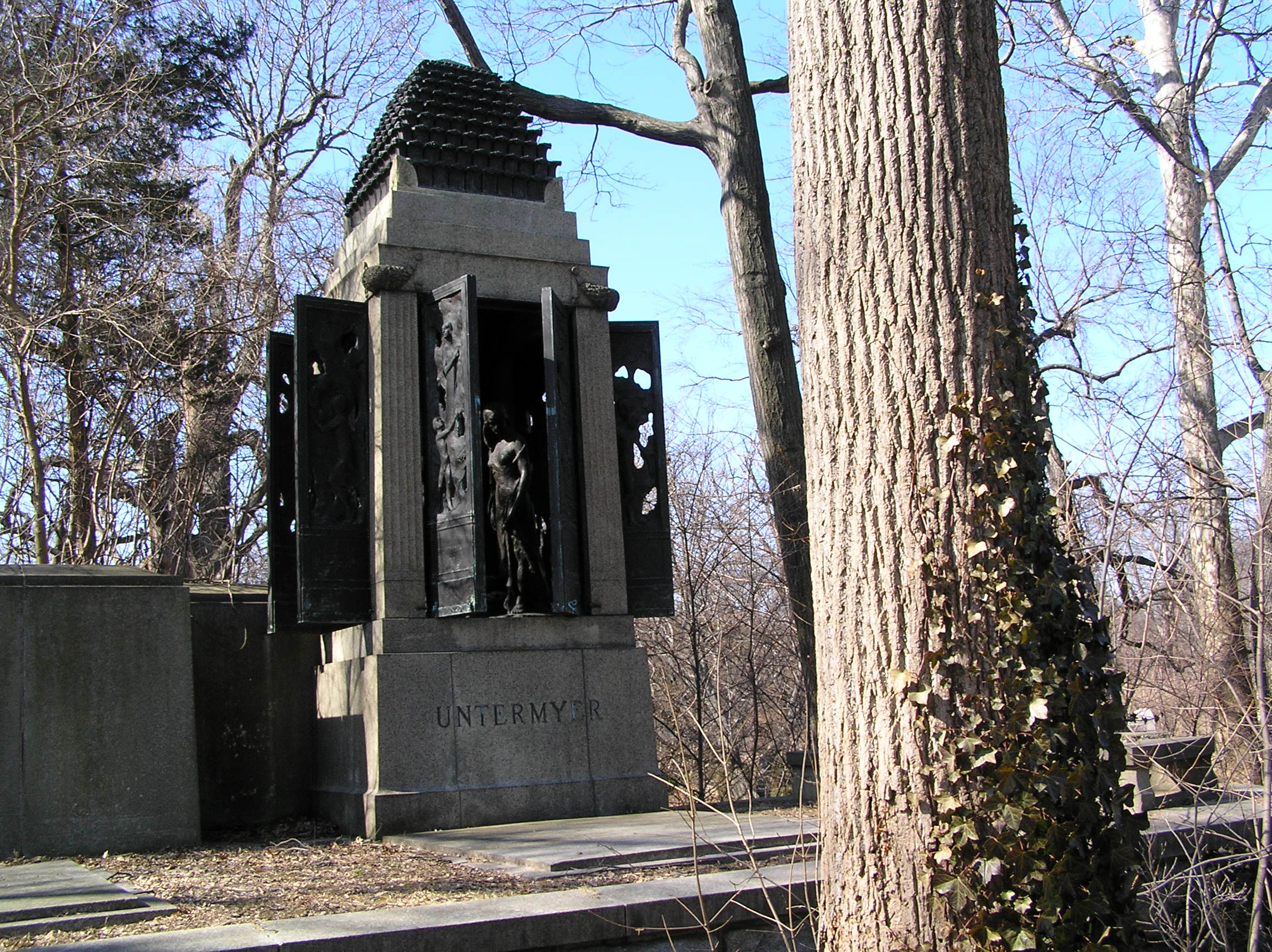
Gravesite of Samuel Untermyer, Woodlawn Cemetery

On August 9, 1880, he married Minnie Carl, daughter of Mairelius Carl of New York City. They had three children, Alvin, who served in the 305th Field Artillery in France during World War I; Irwin Untermyer, a justice of the Appellate Division of the New York Supreme Court, First Judicial Department, and Irene, a philanthropist who married Louis Putnam Myers and, after his death, became the wife of Stanley Richter. Upon the outbreak of World War I, Untermyer, his wife, and two servants were vacationing in Carlsbad, Austria-Hungary, and returned to the United States aboard the Baltic via London in late August.

Investigative reporter Maury Terry (best known for his work on potential links between alleged ritualistic sacrifices at Untermyer Park and the Son of Sam murders) noted Untermyer's purported connections to occult activity, citing a British magazine's claim that Untermyer had been a satanist. "Other researchers stated that Untermyer had belonged to the Golden Dawn society (i.e., Hermetic Order of the Golden Dawn)," Terry wrote, though never himself asserting that Untermyer had been a member of that organization. Untermyer collected art (including Whistler's famous Nocturne in Black and Gold – The Falling Rocket, which he acquired in 1892) and dealt with gardening, especially orchid cultivation, and in 1899 bought the former country house of Samuel Tilden in Yonkers.

The art collection consisted of sixty paintings, tapestries and decorative arts, including Gothic and Renaissance furniture, oriental carpets, Greek and Roman artifacts. The rest of the collection was sold in 1940.

Untermyer died on March 16, 1940, in Palm Springs, California. His body was interred (with an accompanying sculpture by Gertrude Vanderbilt Whitney) at a family plot that he established in Woodlawn Cemetery.
