= Untermyer Park and Gardens =

Public park in Yonkers, New York

- U.S. National Register of Historic Places
- New York State Register of Historic Places
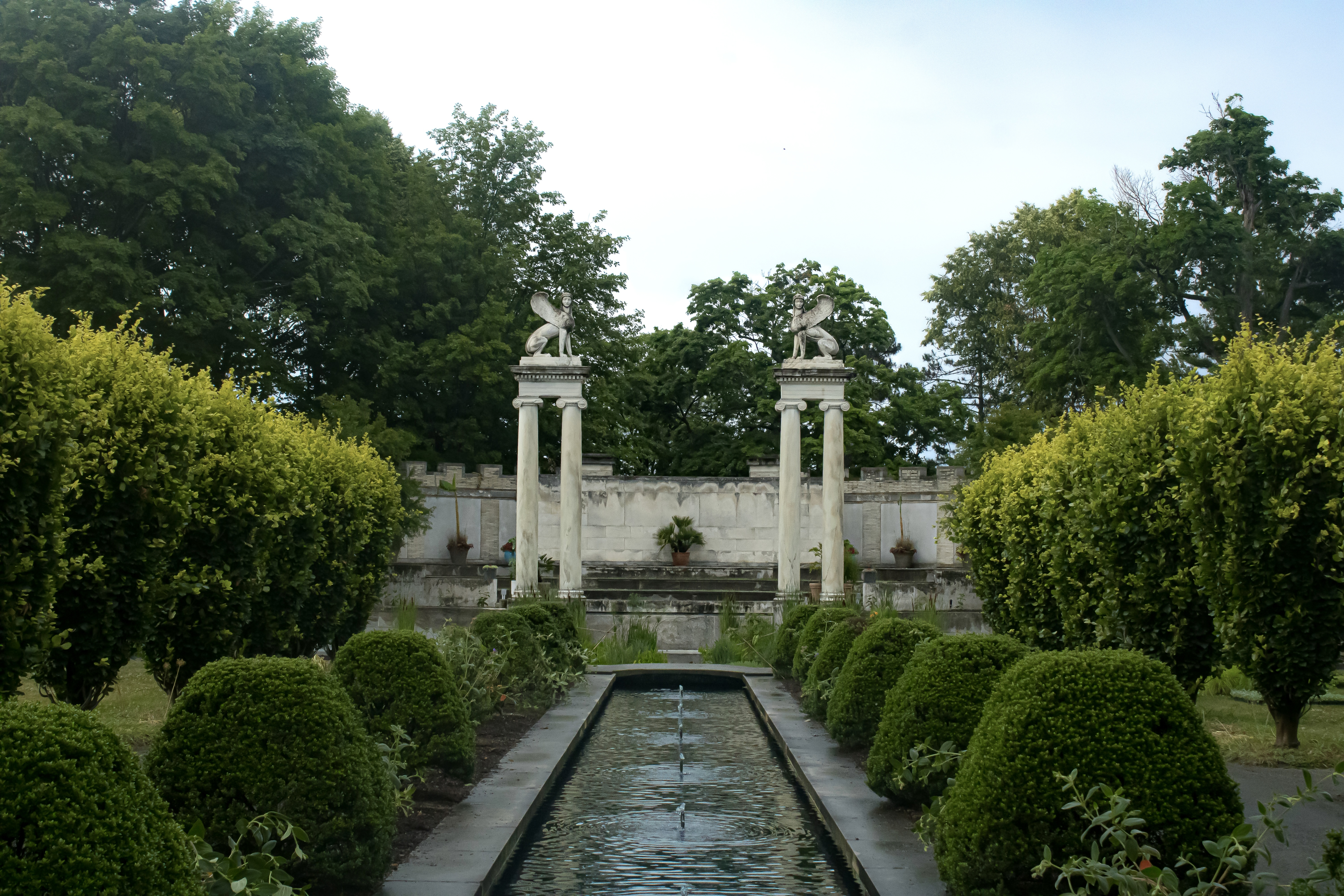
- Sphynxes atop paired ionic columns in the amphitheater of the Walled Garden (2026)

- Location within New York Location within the United States
- Interactive map showing the location for Untermyer Park and Gardens
- Location: 945 North Broadway Yonkers, New York
- Coordinates: 40°58′0″N 73°53′16″W
- Area: 43 acres (17 ha)
- Built: c.1916-1940
- Architect: William W. Bosworth
- Architectural style: various
- NRHP reference No.: 74002263
- NYSRHP No.: 11940.000003

Significant dates
- Added to NRHP: May 31, 1974
- Designated NYSRHP: June 23, 1980

Untermyer Park and Gardens is a historic 43-acre (17 ha) city public park, located in Yonkers, New York in Westchester County, just north of New York City. The park is a remnant of Samuel Untermyer's 150-acre (61 ha) estate "Greystone". Situated on the steep land arising from the eastern bank of the Hudson River to the bluff on top of it, the park's principal feature is the Walled Garden, inspired by ancient Indo-Persian gardens, in which are found a small Grecian-style open-air amphitheater with two opposing sphinxes crouching atop paired Ionic columns; a classical pavilion; a stoa and loggias; and a circular, open-air tempietto called the Temple of the Sky. A long staircase leads from the Walled Garden to an Overlook with views of the river and the Palisades.

The gardens were developed beginning in 1916 by Untermyer, a prominent lawyer and civic leader, and were designed by architect and landscape designer William W. Bosworth, with fountains by Charles Wellford Leavitt, and sculptures by Paul Manship and other artists. The gardens were regularly opened to the public, hosted performances of noted dancers, actors and musicians, and were considered to be among the finest gardens in the United States.

When Untermyer died in 1940, he had hoped to donate the whole estate to New York State Westchester County, or to the City of Yonkers. Eventually Yonkers agreed to accept part of the estate. The parcel, which was the core of the gardens, and which has been added to since that time, was renamed Untermyer Park and Gardens in his honor. It was added to the National Register of Historic Places in 1974.

Untermyer Gardens has recently undergone a significant campaign of restorations, which is continuing.

== History ==
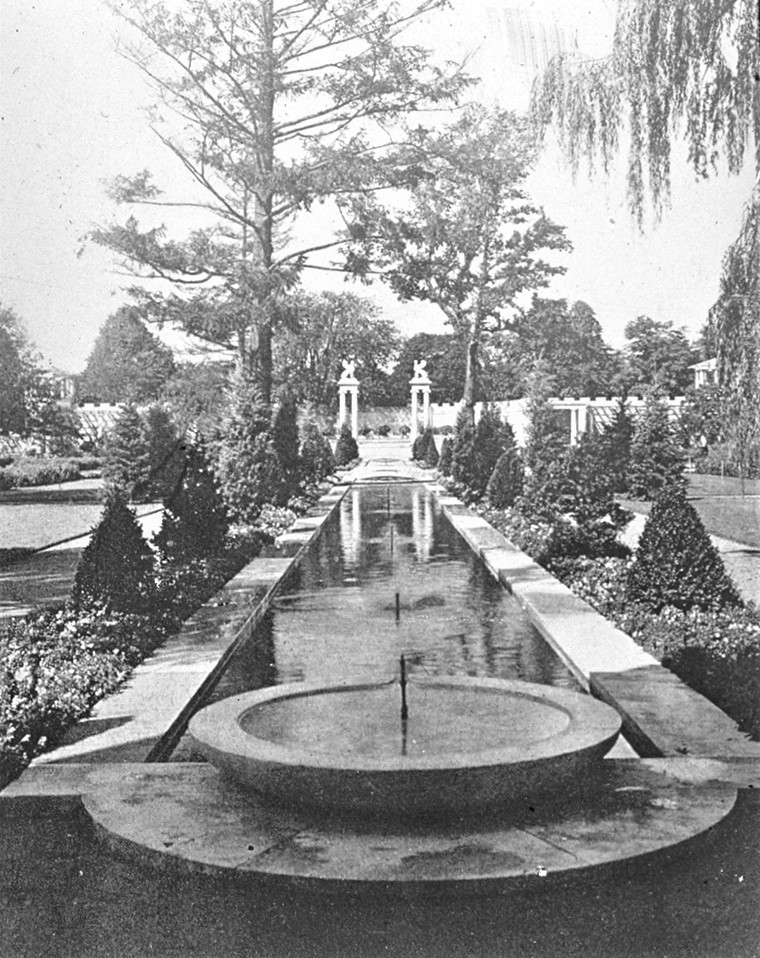
The North Canal of the Walled Garden with the sphynxes in the background (c.1900)

In 1865, John T. Waring, the owner of the largest hat factory in the U.S., bought 33 acres of land from the Bolmer estate, and had architect John Davis Hatch build a turreted mansion on it which Waring called "Greystone", a name which remains on the nearby Metro-North train station. In 1876, Waring had some financial reversals and moved to Boston, putting the 99-room mansion up for rent.

Politician Samuel J. Tilden a former governor of New York state and a failed Presidential candidate, rented the mansion from Waring in 1879, and bought it and the estate soon after. Tilden had an interest in horticulture and built 13 greenhouses to grow ornamental plants as well as fruits and vegetables.

Tilden died at Greystone on August 4, 1886, and Samuel Untermyer bought the 133-acre (54 ha) property at auction in 1899 from Tilden's estate. Untermyer – who was born in Virginia in 1858 and moved to New York City as a boy – was a lawyer, a partner in the firm of Guggenheimer, Untermyer & Marshall. He is noted as being the first lawyer in the U.S. to receive a fee of one million dollars for a single case. A very successful investor, Untermyer became extremely wealthy. He also transitioned from practicing corporate law to taking cases which involved promoting the public welfare.

=== Building the gardens ===
Untermyer had a passion for horticulture, which he said he inherited from his mother, and was an expert in the subject. According to his family, if he could have lived his life over again, he would have wanted to be the New York City Parks Commissioner. Untermyer wanted his estate to have formal gardens, and his competitive nature wanted them to be better than John D. Rockefeller's, whose estate Kykuit was not too far away, so in 1916, after buying additional property to the north and east of the original estate to expand it to 150 acres (61 ha), Untermyer hired the École des Beaux Arts-trained architect and landscape designer William Welles Bosworth – who had contributed to the architecture of Kykuit on and off for 20 years – to build "the finest garden in America."

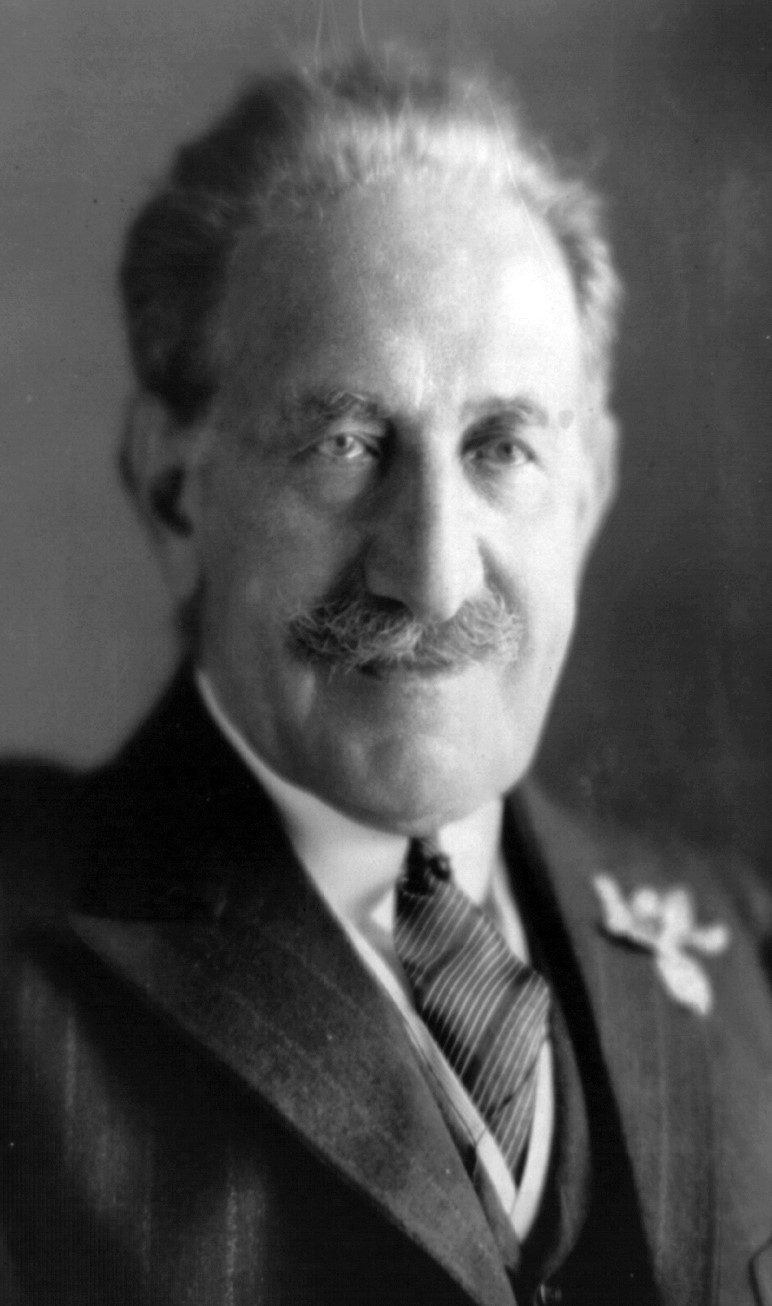
Samuel Untermyer (1932)

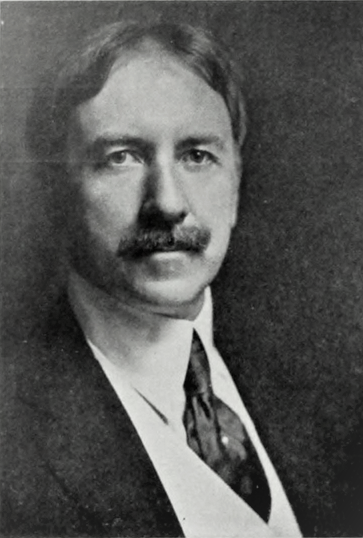
William Welles Bosworth (c.1915)

Bosworth, despite his Beaux Arts training, had become conflicted about the influence of that style on American landscape gardening, and the jumble of other styles that were mixed into it with imported garden ornaments from Europe. In an article in The American Architect he complained about the "resulting incoherence [due to the fact that] lacking a tradition at home, our minds are furnished with pictures of every sort of formal garden." He regretted that the U.S. had "no pure historic style" of its own. Bosworth himself preached that the topography of the land on which the garden was to be built, and the position of the house on the property, should determine what kind of features it should contain. To Bosworth, it was also ideal that the house and garden should be built at the same time. This was not possible with the Untermyer estate, as Greystone was already built and was not well-sited for Bosworth's purposes. The land as well was not flat and regular as a tradition formal garden would require. Instead, Untermyer's estate was rocky and irregular with hillocks, mounds, outcroppings and dips, and it sloped steeply down to the Hudson River.

In addition, while Rockefeller wanted a spring and fall garden, as he and his family did not live at Kykuit in the summer, Untermyer's focus was on horticulture and growing things, and wanted Bosworth to provide – along with stands of trees, water features and architectural effects – a plan which would allow for fruits, shrubs and flower to be grown. Bosworth decided that the only part of the estate which would be appropriate for this was the site of a previous garden in the northeast portion of the property. The difficulty was to unify the landscape, and integrate the main house, several smaller houses, and the greenhouses – which Bosworth did not appreciate, but which were extremely important to Untermyer – into the overall scheme.

Bosworth came up with a plan for the gardens: the greenhouse would act as a portal to the formal landscapes, of which there would be six main sections, the Walled Garden, the Vista, the Color Gardens, the Rose Garden, the Vegetable Gardens, and the Temple of Love, perched on a rocky promontory. Of these, the Walled Garden – which was not always called that – was the most significant. This 3-acre (1.2 ha) "Indo-Persian kind of garden", as Bosworth called it, had crenellated of walls of beige bricks on three sides, with octagonal towers, all covered in cream-colored stucco scored with a diamond pattern. Bosworth may have been inspired by the Agra Fort in northern India. The fourth side of the garden was open to views of the Hudson. The main entrance was a large rectangular limestone gate topped by a relief of Artemis by Ulric H. Ellerhusen.

The Walled Garden has a canal which ran south-north, from the entrance to the small open-air amphitheater at the other end, and another which bisects it running east-west, with a small pool at the intersection. Each canal has numerous water jets. Untermyer had hired the engineer Charles Wellford Leavitt to design the fountains for the gardens.

The Walled Garden also featured the Temple of the Sky, an open-air circular 30-foot (9.1 m) colonnade of 14 Corinthian columns topped by an entablature, overlooking a swimming pool. The floor of the colonnade was a circular pink, grey and pale green mosaic, with the head of Medusa at the center.

The result was, for a time, one of the most celebrated gardens in the United States. Untermyer opened the grounds weekly to the public in the 1920s and '30s and for special events, such as displays of his noted chrysanthemums and tulips. On a single day in 1939, 30,000 people visited the gardens. Noted artists also performed there, such as Isadora Duncan

The quality of horticulture at the Untermyer Gardens was nationally recognized and served as a training ground for professional gardeners. Eventually, the estate had 60 greenhouses and employed 60 gardeners.

=== The gardens after Untermyer ===
Untermyer died in 1940. He had wished to give the gardens to New York State, Westchester County, or to the City of Yonkers, but because of the great cost of the upkeep of the gardens, which were not accompanied by an endowment, the bequest was initially refused by all three bodies. Finally, in 1946, 16 acres (6.5 ha) of the land was accepted as a gift by the City of Yonkers, and became a city public park. The mansion itself was eventually torn down.

Because of inadequate funding, much of the property was not maintained; a number of structures gradually fell into disrepair, and parts of the site became overgrown, reverting to woodland. In 1976, the Untermyer Park and Gardens experienced a period of vandalism and unrest, as neighbors reported hearing chanting, and seeing torches being carried through the woods at night. This culminated in the discovery of the remains of several mutilated dogs in the aqueduct south of the park. David Berkowitz, the notorious "Son of Sam" serial killer, reported being part of a Satanic cult that met in the grounds of the park. The allegation was neither proven nor disproven.

In the 1970s an effort was made to restore the garden by Yonkers Mayor Angelo Martinelli, architect James Piccone and Larry Martin, but the campaign was short-lived and the property deteriorated again. Untermyer Park and Gardens was added to the National Register of Historic Places in 1974.

In the 1990s community leaders such as Nortrud Spero and Joe Kozlowski persuaded Mayor Terence Zaleski to purchase more of the original estate's land with the help of the Open Space Institute resulting in the 43 acres (17 ha) of the park today.

Since 2011, the Untermyer Gardens Conservancy, a non-profit organization, has been working to restore the gardens, in partnership with the Yonkers Parks Department. The Conservancy employs head gardener Timothy Tilghman in a team of 10 gardeners, and receives advice from Wave Hill's founding director of horticulture, Marco Polo Stufano.

== Gardens ==
Untermyer Park and Gardens has a number of preserved, restored or re-imagined main features, plus some remnants of original features such as the Sundial Garden, the Six Color Gardens, and the Rose and Dahlia Garden.

=== Walled Garden ===
The Walled Garden – which is surrounded by crenellated walls with octagonal towers – is based on the Indo-Persian gardens of antiquity, called Paradise gardens or charbaghs. Like those ancient gardens, it is divided into quadrilateral sections by waterways, a concept based on the four gardens of Paradise or Eden mentioned in the Qur'an and the Bible. In the Bible, the four rivers of Eden were the Pison, the Gihon, the Tigris and the Euphrates, while the two trees were the Tree of Life and the Tree of Knowledge of Good and Evil. In Islamic scripture, Paradise (jannah) had four rivers: water, milk, honey and wine, and the Tree of Life. The four waterways of the Untermyer gardens are – clockwise from the garden's entrance – the South, West, North and East Canals, which meet in a pool at the center.

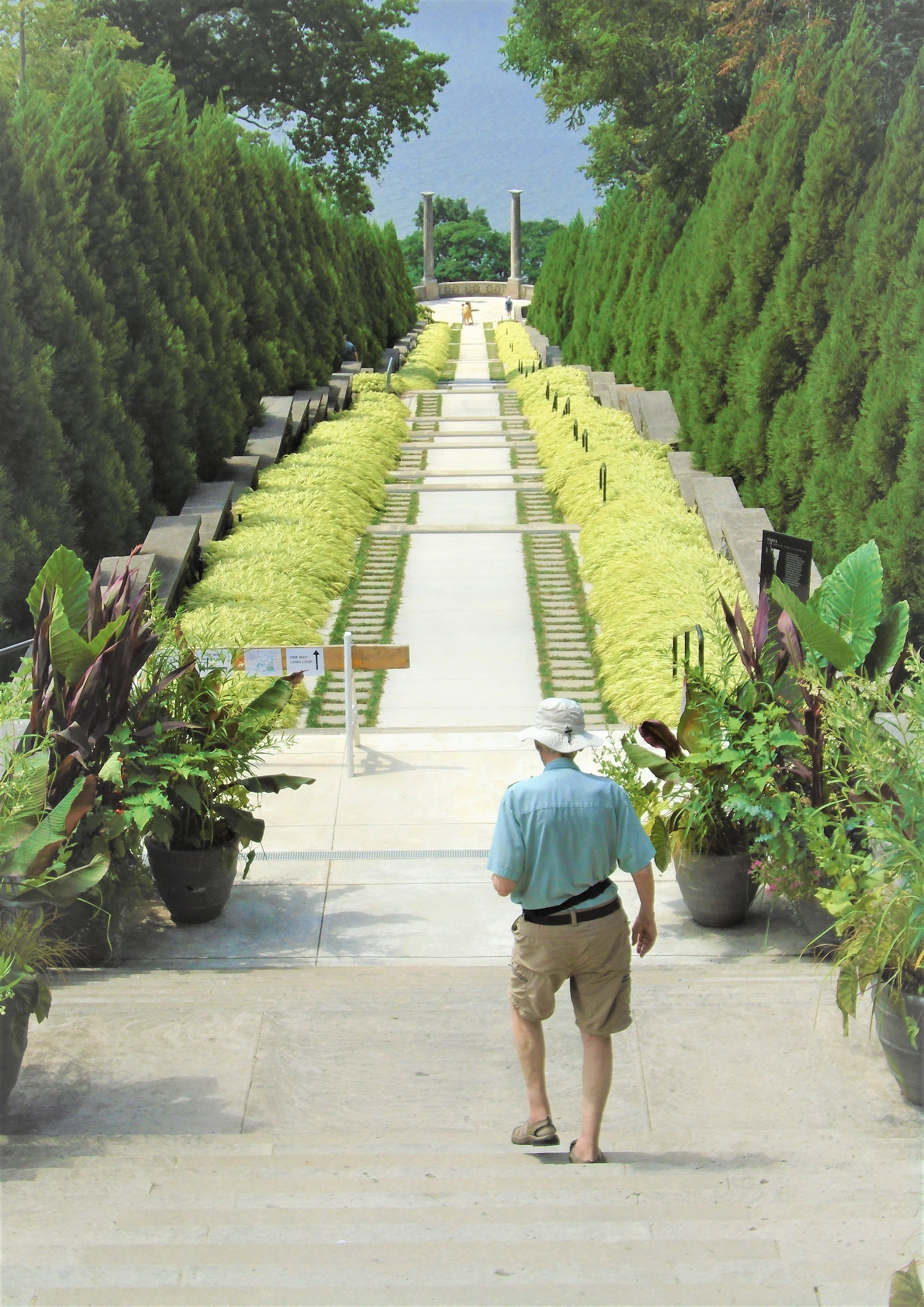
The Vista looking west to the Hudson River and The Overlook

While conceptually Indo-Persian, many of the elements that Bosworth designed for the Walled Garden are derived from Greek models, such as the Temple of the Sky, a tempietto, on the western edge of the garden, a circle of Corinthian columns made of Alabama marble topped by an entablature, with a large swimming pool with lion's heads sculpted by Frederick G.R Roth spouting water, (Note: As of 2020 the Temple of the Sky is under restoration.) the Doric stoa on the eastern wall for guests to relax in, and the open air amphitheater at the north end where performers would entertain guests. A prominent feature of the amphitheater are the two facing marble sphinxes sculpted by Paul Manship, one of the most famous sculptors of the time, which sit on platforms each supported by two tall Ionic columns of cipollino marble. The sphinxes were influenced by Attic architecture.

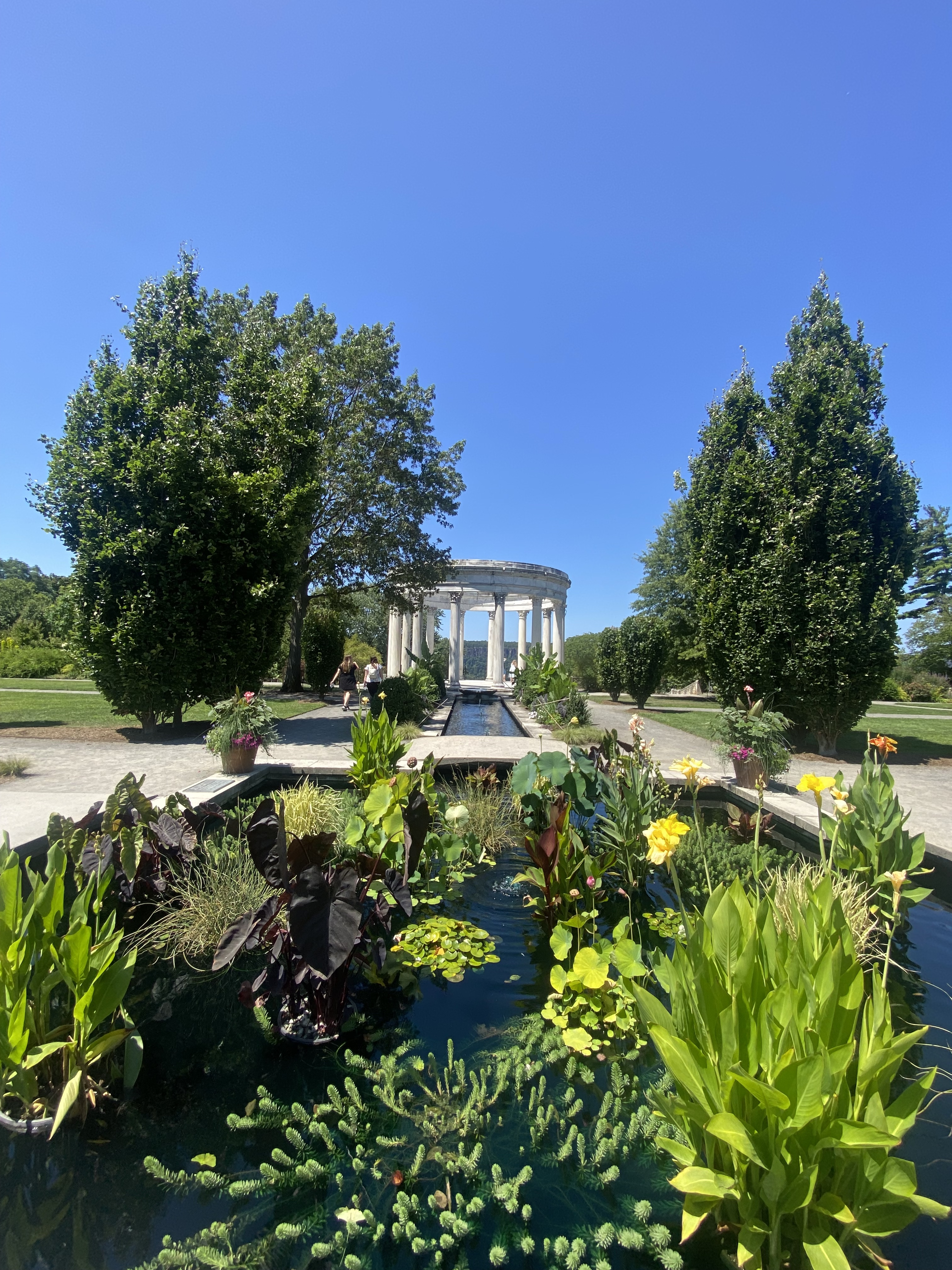

Other architectural elements, such as the great gate through which one enters the garden, and the tiled stage of the amphitheater, were based on Mycenaean motifs. The gate was based on the Bronze Age Great Lion Gate of the citadel of Mycenae, but without the two sculpted lions of the original, while the tiling of the amphitheater's stage floor was based on a fresco from the ancient city of Tiryns, which featured spirals and papyrus lotus blossoms.

=== The Vista and Overlook ===
The Vista is a long descending staircase which runs from an inconspicuous doorway in the loggia of the lower terrace of the Walled Garden down towards the Hudson River, where it culminates in the Vista Overlook. The staircase is modeled on the Renaissance era Villa d'Este in Italy at Lake Como. The sides were originally planted with Japanese cedar trees to mimic the dark cypress trees of the original staircase, however non-native tree species invaded, and the cedars had to be restored later.

The Overlook features two ancient Roman monolithic cipollino marble columns which came from the estate of noted architect Stanford White.

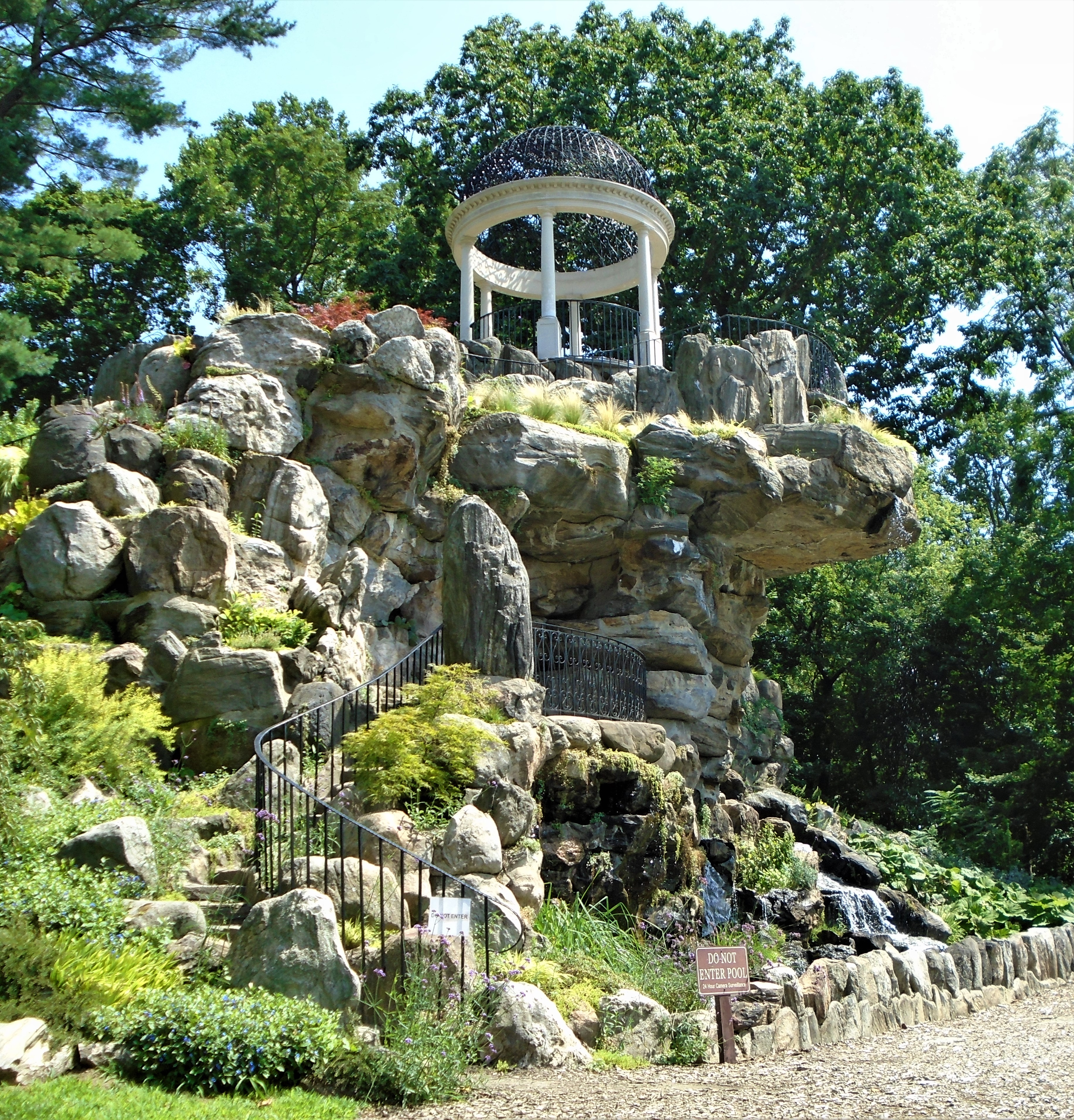
The Temple of Love

=== The Temple of Love and Rock and Stream Garden ===
The Temple of Love is a cantilevered rocky fantasy designed by a Genoese stone mason Carlo Davite, with a round temple folly on top. In Untermyer's time it was surrounded by an extensive rock garden with terraced beds. Many of the rocks are hollowed out in order to be used as planters.

The Rock and Stream Garden is the remnant of the original Rock Garden, which featured a tiny stream running through a jumble of stones. It was buried beneath vegetation and dirt for many years, until it was rediscovered and rebuilt using elements of the original, and connecting it to the watercourse of the Temple of Love, which includes waterfalls, ponds and bridges.

=== Lion & Unicorn Gate and Ruin Garden ===
The Lion and Unicorn Gate entrance to the gardens is located at the Old Croton Aqueduct State Historic Park. The old gatehouse is now the Ruin Garden, completed in 2019. The lion and unicorn sculptures were restored, including a new head for the unicorn, and the masonry was cleaned and restored. A root cellar was converted into a grotto and fountain. Actual graffiti inside the gatehouse was preserved, and the plantings of the garden are meant to give the feeling of being in an abandoned, ruined house.

=== Rhododendron Walk ===
The densely-planted Rhododendron Walk, a new feature dating from 2019, is meant to evoke Untermyer's rhododendron collection. It leads from the Ruin Garden to the main gardens above.

=== Ornamental Vegetable Garden and Orchard ===
With its restored pergola and parterre layout, vegetables and fruit trees are planted in a formal configuration with an eye to aesthetic beauty. The garden is tended by student interns from Yonkers public high schools. The terrace below the garden will feature a row of bronze sculptures of Hudson River painters by the noted artist Greg Wyatt.

== Gallery ==
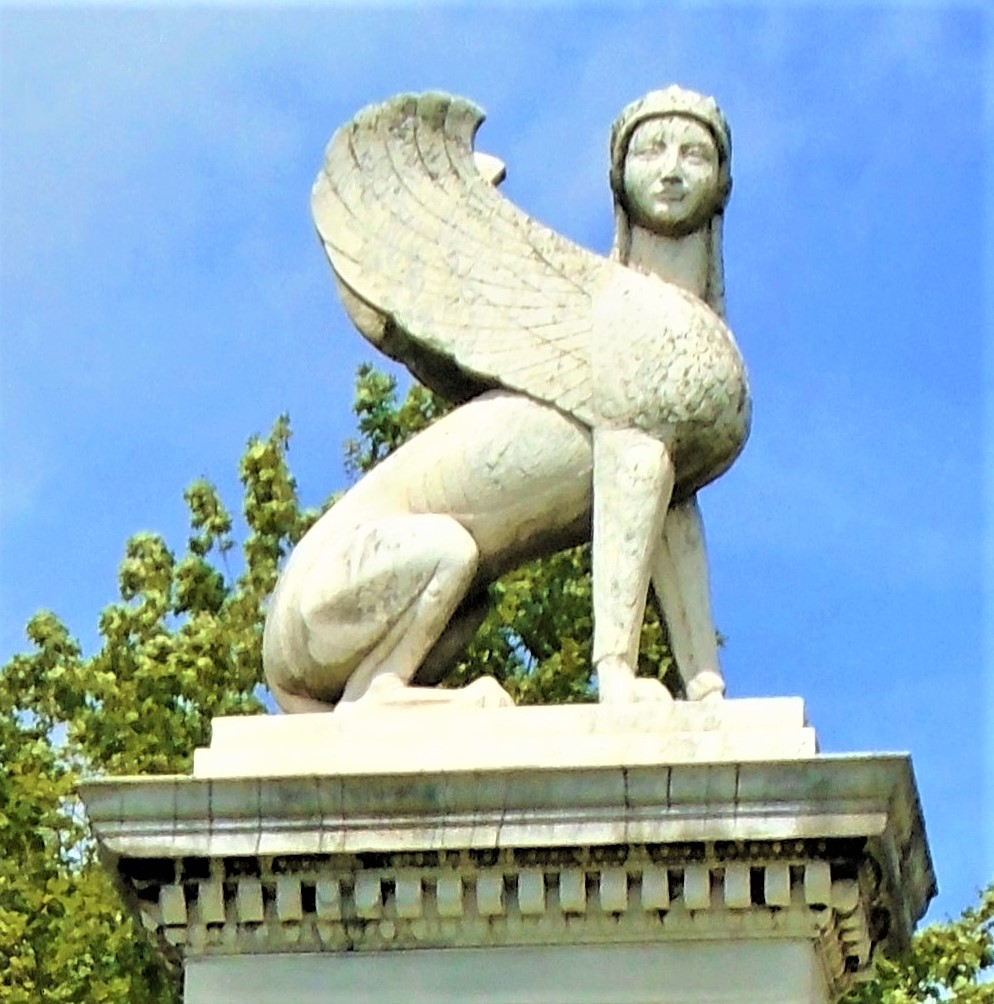
One of Paul Manship's sphinxes

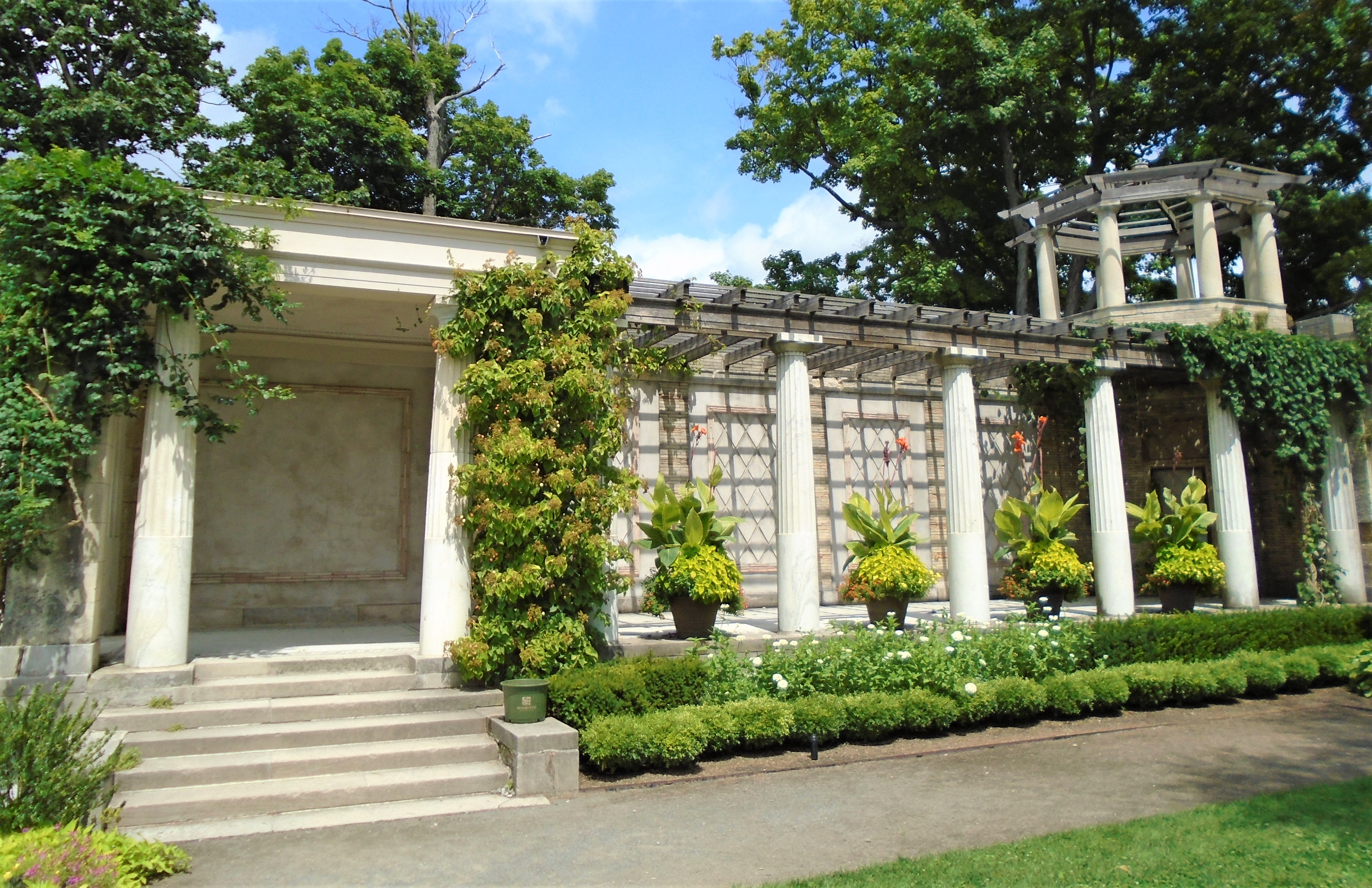
One of the Walled Garden's loggias

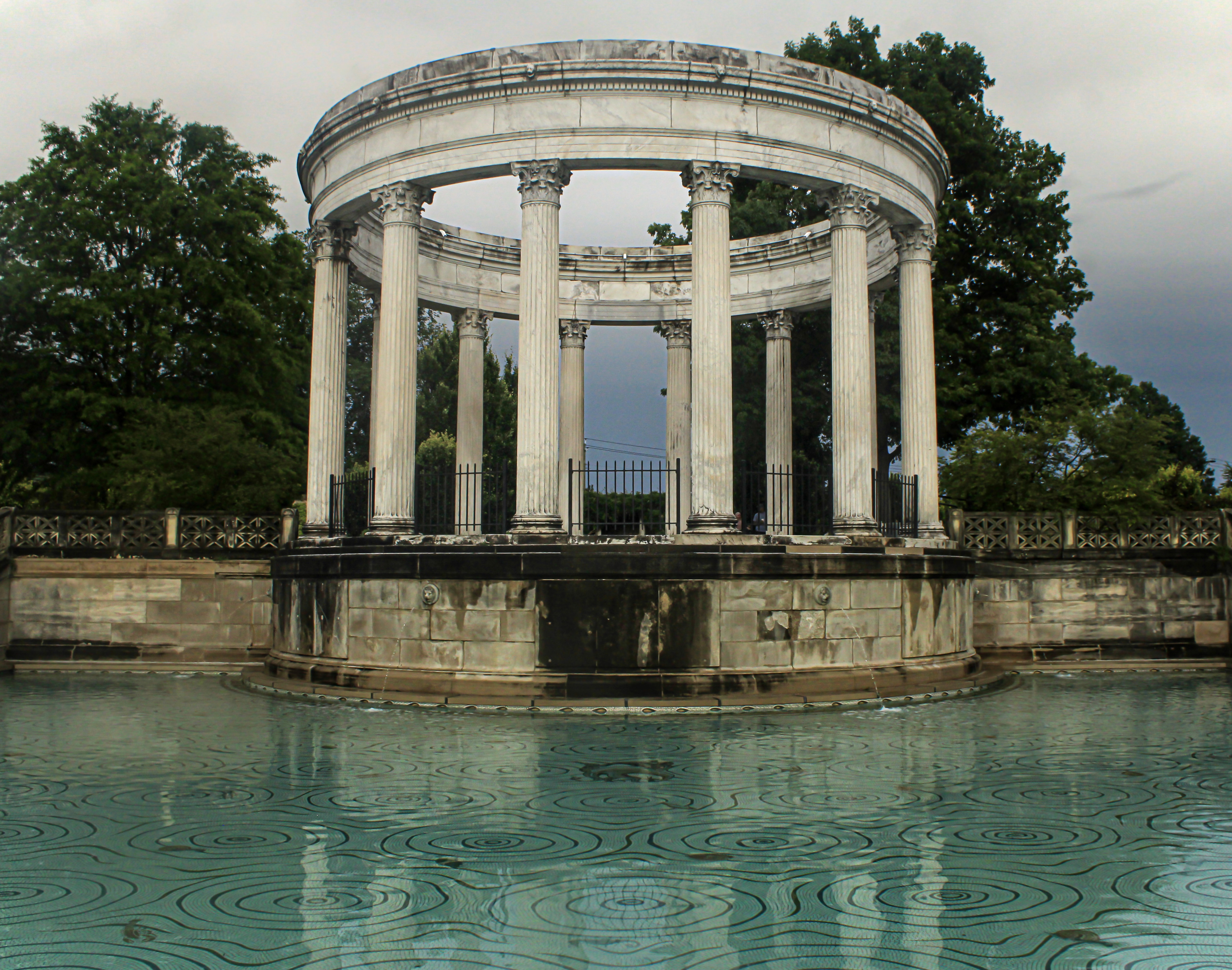
The Temple of the Sky in the Walled Garden

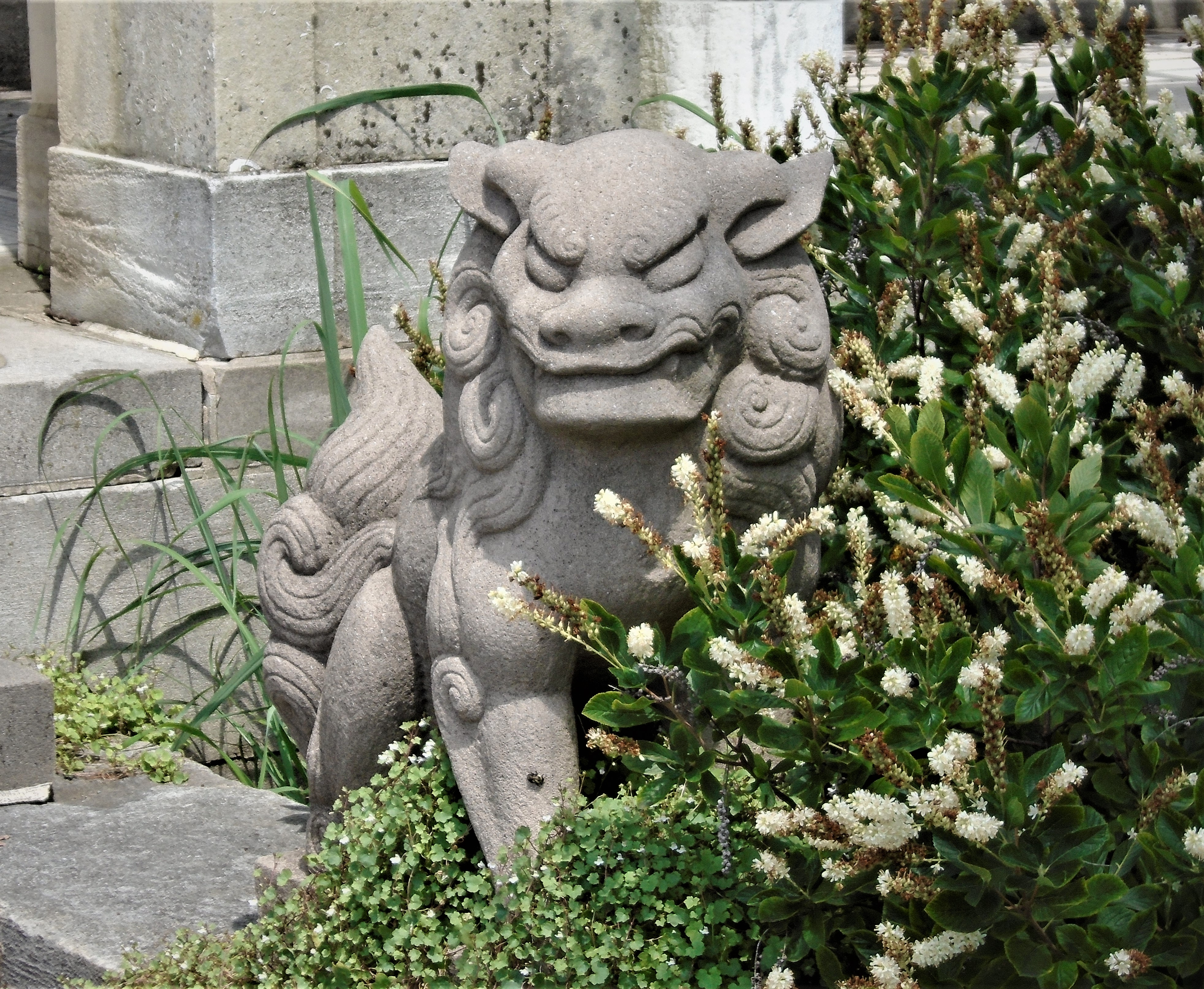
A Foo Dog sculpture in the Walled Garden

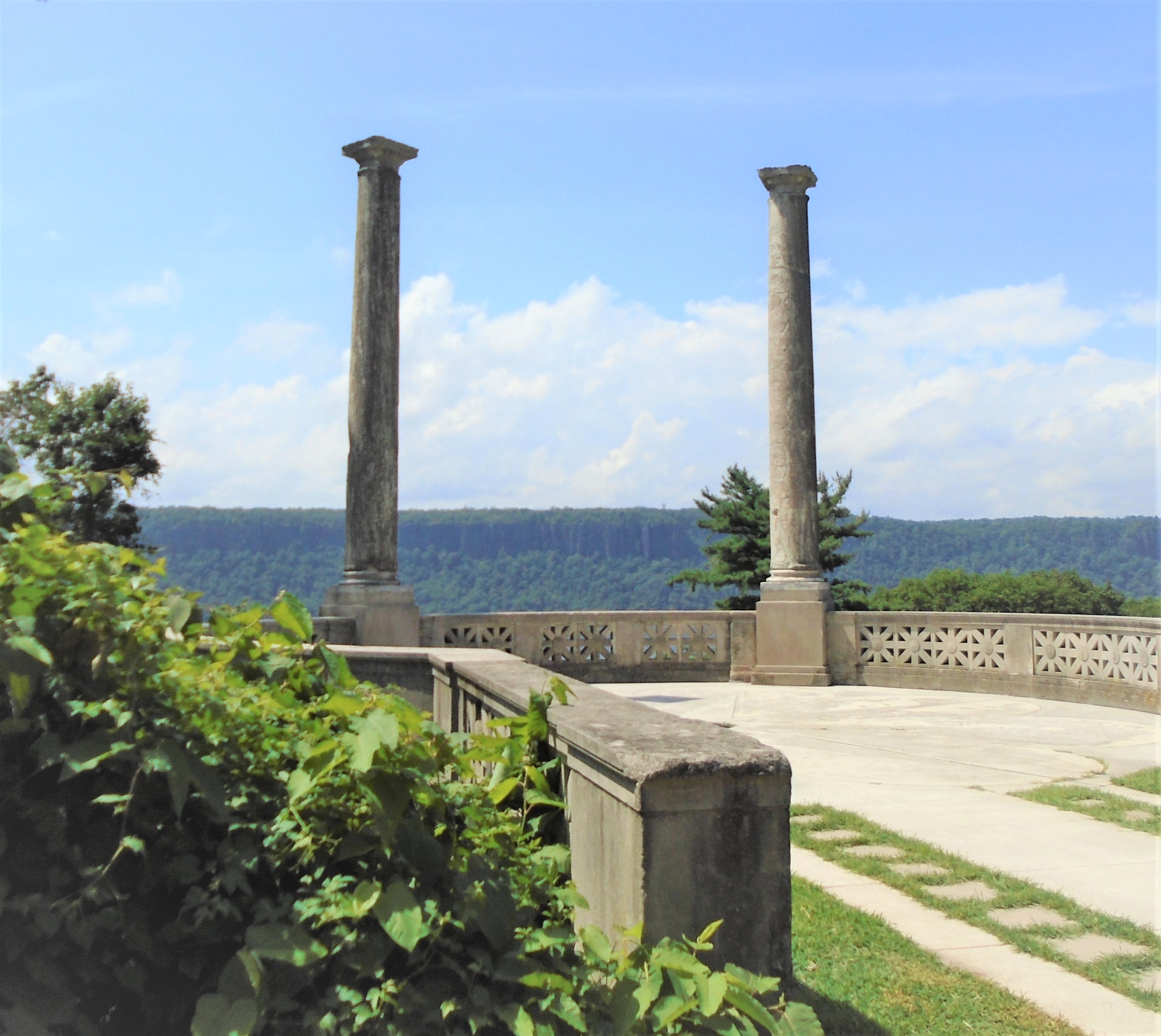
The Overlook, with the Hudson River Palisades in the background

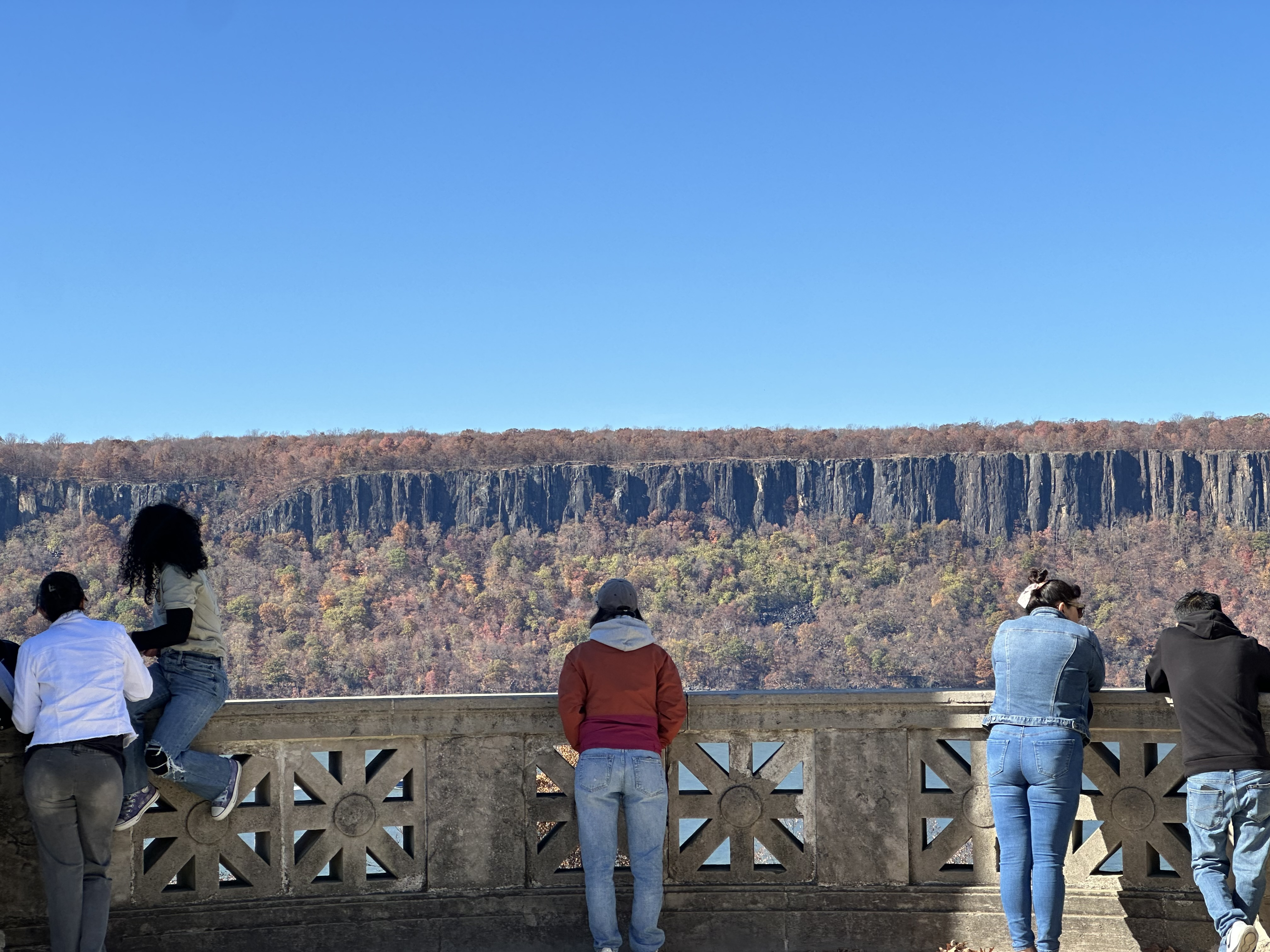
View of the Hudson River Palisades in winter
