= Bibliothèque Municipale =

Bibliothèque Municipale (English:Municipal library) may be:

- Bibliothèque municipale de Besançon
- Bibliothèque municipale de Bordeaux
- Bibliothèque municipale de Cambrai
- Bibliothèque municipale de Colmar
- Bibliothèque municipale de Douai
- Bibliothèque municipale de Grenoble
- Bibliothèque municipale de Lyon
- Bibliothèque municipale de Nancy
- Bibliothèque Municipale de Riom

== See also ==
- Libraries in France
