= Tours municipal library =

Historic municipal library in Tours, France

Tours Municipal Library
- Bibliothèque municipale de Tours
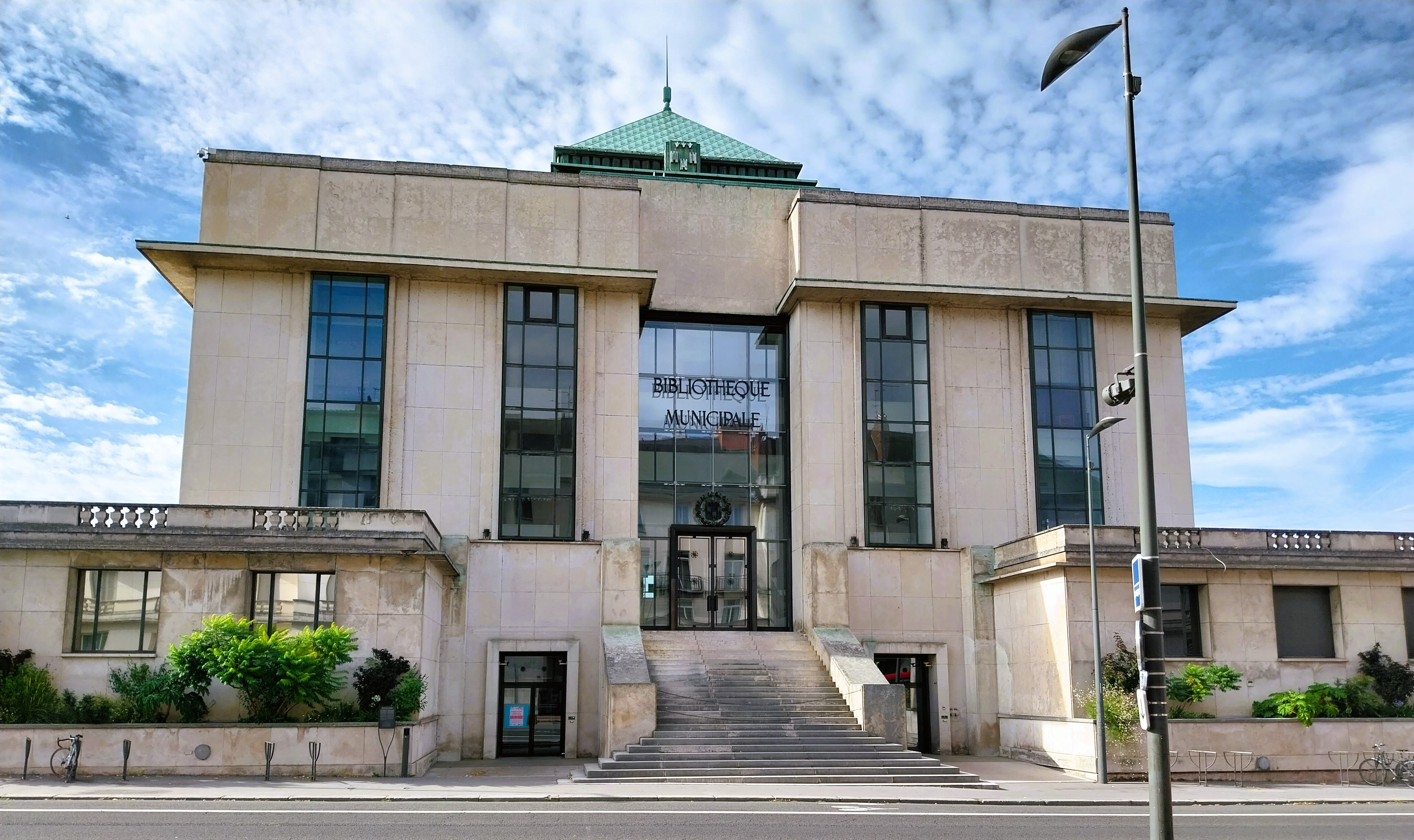
- Central entrance
- Interactive map of Tours Municipal Library
- Location: Tours, Indre-et-Loire, Centre-Val de Loire, France
- Coordinates: 47.3973°N 0.6878°E
- Designer: Pierre Patout, Jean Dorian, Charles Dorian
- Type: Library
- Material: Concrete, stone
- Beginning date: 1954
- Completion date: 1957
- Opening date: November 1957
- Restored date: 2012–2013
- Website: www.bm-tours.fr
- Monument status: Inscrit MH (1996)

The Tours Municipal Library (French: Bibliothèque municipale de Tours) is a historic building registered as a monument historique in France, designed by architects Pierre Patout, Jean Dorian, and Charles Dorian. Located at 2 bis, Avenue André-Malraux, it is near Place Anatole-France, the Wilson Bridge, and Rue Nationale, along the banks of the Loire River. The building now serves as the "Central Library" within the Tours library network, which includes seven libraries, a mediabus, and four documentation centers.

== History ==
=== Building history ===
The previous municipal library was destroyed in June 1940 during a fire caused by German incendiary shelling, which devastated the city's monumental entrance. Reconstruction of the library was entrusted to architect Pierre Patout in July 1950, who was also responsible for rebuilding the affected neighborhood.

Construction began in June 1953, with an official ceremony on 29 May 1954 for the laying of the first stone, presided over by André Marie, the Minister of National Education. After an extended construction period, the library opened to the public in November 1957.

A notable example of post-World War II reconstruction architecture, the building marks the historic northern entrance to Tours. It has been registered as a monument historique since 31 December 1996.

Significant renovations and compliance upgrades required the library's closure from April 2012 to December 2013.

=== Leadership ===
In 1953, René Fillet was appointed director of both the Tours Municipal Library and the Indre-et-Loire Departmental Lending Library. He became known for his efforts to promote public reading. Fillet established France's first school bibliobus in 1956, expanded the fleet of bibliobuses in Indre-et-Loire, and created several annexes for the municipal library.

== Architecture ==
The library features a cubic central structure flanked by two single-story lateral wings. Its framework is constructed from concrete, with facades filled with moellons and clad-in-stone panels. The top floor, housing a glass-walled auditorium, is capped by a pyramidal copper roof with a patinated finish. The building's exterior has remained largely unchanged, though interior modifications include the creation of a rare books section and two exhibition rooms.

== Collections ==
The library's collections originated from the revolutionary seizures of ecclesiastical properties in 1791. However, frequent relocations to unsuitable locations and the municipality's initial lack of interest led to numerous thefts, particularly of manuscripts. In the latter half of the 19th century, a classification system was implemented, and the documents were cataloged, enabling curator Auguste Dorange to produce the first manuscript catalog in 1875.

Most of the library's historic collections were destroyed in the 19 June 1940 fire caused by German bombings. Only the most valuable manuscripts and a few incunabula were saved. The rare books collection was partially reconstituted post-war through purchases and significant donations, notably from Abbot Raymond Marcel in 1972.

In 2018, author and presenter Patrice Wolf donated approximately 15,000 children's literature books and documents to the library. In 2019, these were organized into the Centre Patrice Wolf, with a logo designed and donated by Bruno Heitz.

== See also ==
- Pierre Patout
- Monument historique
- Loire River
- Tours
- Bookmobile
- List of libraries in France
