= Bischofsherrschaft =

Episcopal rule in late antique Gaul

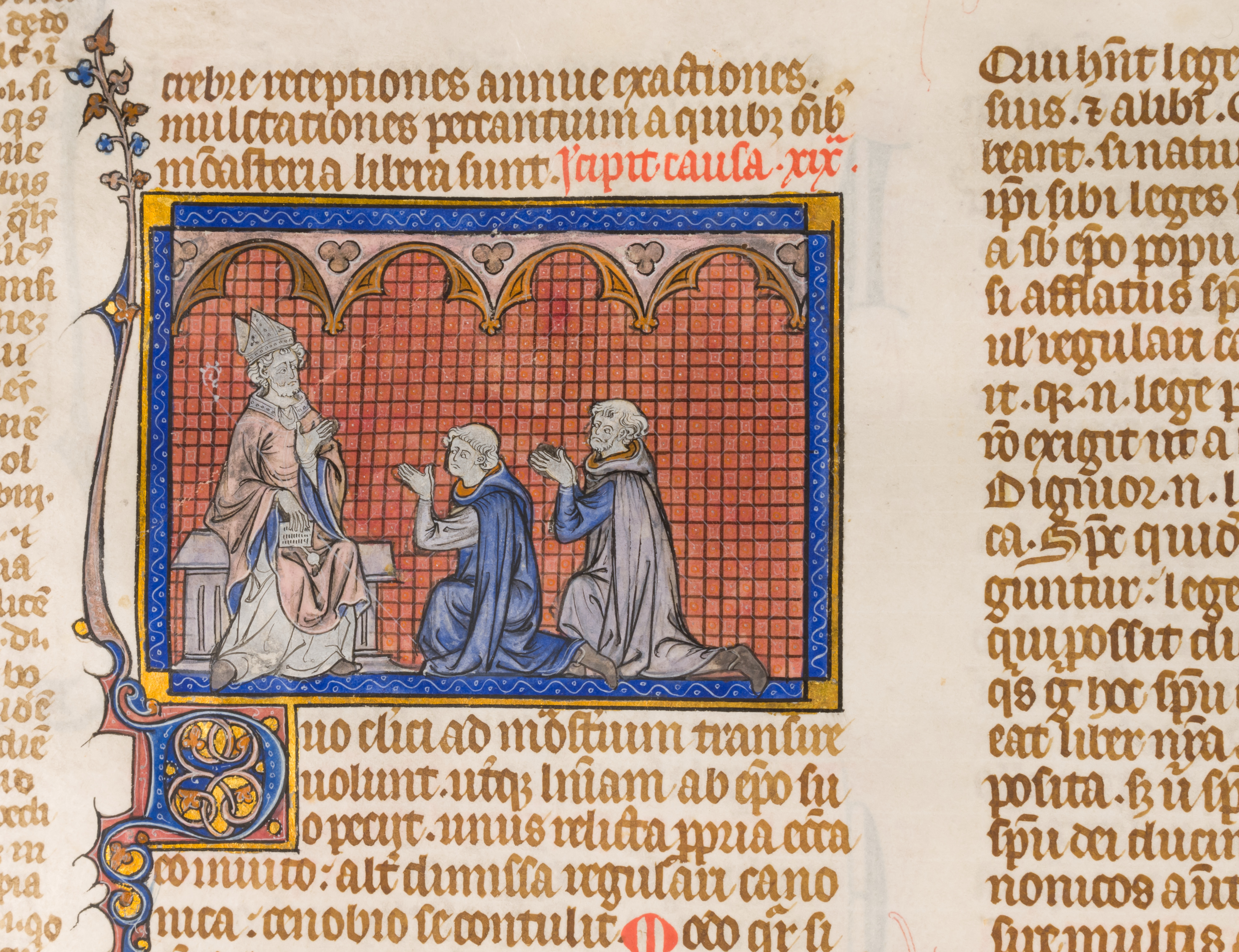
Illumination by Master Honoré from a manuscript of the Decree of Gratian, showing a bishop seated on a throne with mitre and staff in front of two kneeling clerics, ca. 1290, Metropolitan Museum of Art.

Bischofsherrschaft or "episcopal rule" refers to a phenomenon that occurred predominantly in late antique Gaul, where the episcopate was also of secular importance, as well as the particularity of an increased occupation of the episcopate by the local Gallo-Roman aristocracy from the first third of the 5th century onwards.

This was partly due to the specific circumstances of the Gallic cities with their large civitas territories, whose self-confident elite saw themselves in part as an antithesis to the imperial centre in Italy and discovered in the office of bishop a suitable opportunity for political activity and the preservation of their social leadership position.

German historical studies coined the term 'terminus technicus', which is also used in English and French research publications.

== History ==
=== From the early Christian presbyteral constitution to the monepiscopate ===
From 80 AD, many congregations adopted a presbyteral constitution with a governing body placed above the congregation, which no longer represented a mere congregational council, as was assumed for the elders in the Jerusalem congregation under Jacob. Presbyters (from the ancient Greek πρεσβύτερος presbýteros "elder", the root of the word 'priest') were early Christian ministers who supported the bishop and formed the presbyterate with him. There was often no clear distinction between the episcopate (from the ancient Greek ἐπίσκοπος epískopos 'overseer') and the presbyterate, and in many places the bishop was appointed from the group of presbyters. The (mon-)episcopate, i.e. the office of bishop and the leadership of Christian communities by a single bishop, became established from the 2nd century onwards.

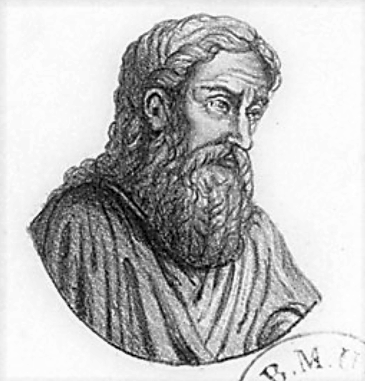
Portrait of Sidonius Apollinaris, printed from the collection 'L'Auvergne en portraits' of the Bibliothèque du patrimoine de Clermont Auvergne Métropole.

=== Bischofsherrschaft/ Episcopal rule in late antique Gaul ===
From the 5th century onwards, the bishop elected for life assumed such a prominent role in society that the term 'episcopal rule' became established, particularly in Gaul. The Gallo-Roman senate nobility now modified the framework of thought that had previously been shaped by the empire and legitimised rule in Gallia. Against the resistance of those who, according to long-held ideas, did not define the office of bishop in such a secular way, the Gallic aristocracy, which had previously acted at imperial level, integrated the episcopal dignity as the crowning achievement in the cursus honorum and thus changed the framework for political legitimisation, its self-interpretation and the political order from the emperors of antiquity in the Roman Empire to the medieval Merovingians in Paris.

=== Rule and power of Gallo-Roman bishops ===
Some bishops definitely exercised secular power and built walls and water pipes (such as Sidonius Apollinaris, as handed down by Sulpicius Severus), negotiated for their city in times of war and peace and sometimes even commanded 'troops not only for defence'.

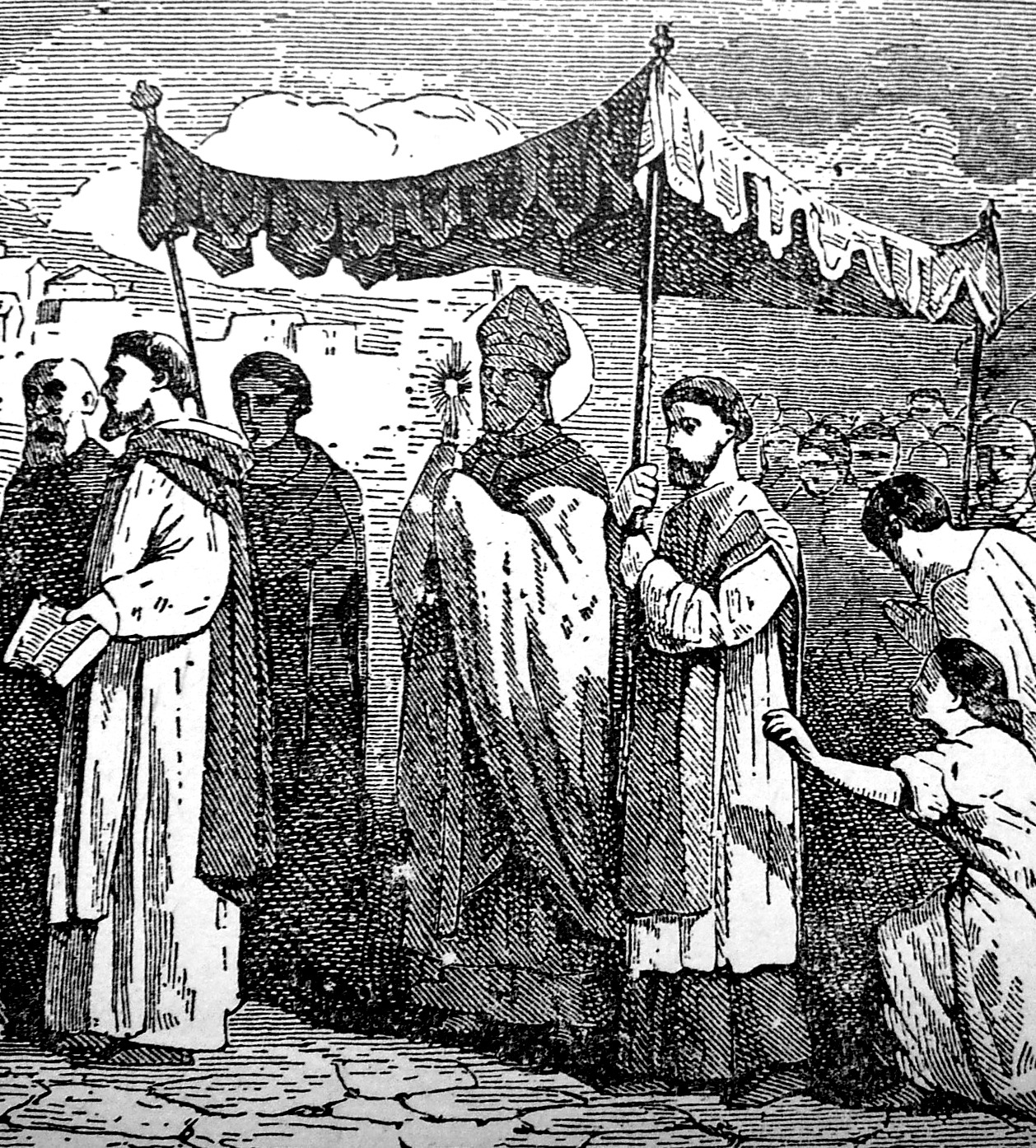
St Mamertus during the supplication procession

=== Liturgy as an instrument of power ===
The liturgy also changed considerably in the 5th century, consecrated persons had to give up their secular professions, were uniformed (tonsure, dress) and carried the rule of the bishop in a tightly organised manner. In Vienne around 470, Bishop Mamertus even used his freedom to organise the liturgy to consolidate the legitimacy of his political rule by inventing a procession of supplication on the occasion of severe storms, which led from the city walls of Vienne to the nearest basilica and which many people ruefully followed, although this caused great indignation among Mamertus' aristocratic peers.
