= Pierre-Fanlac Media Library =

French library

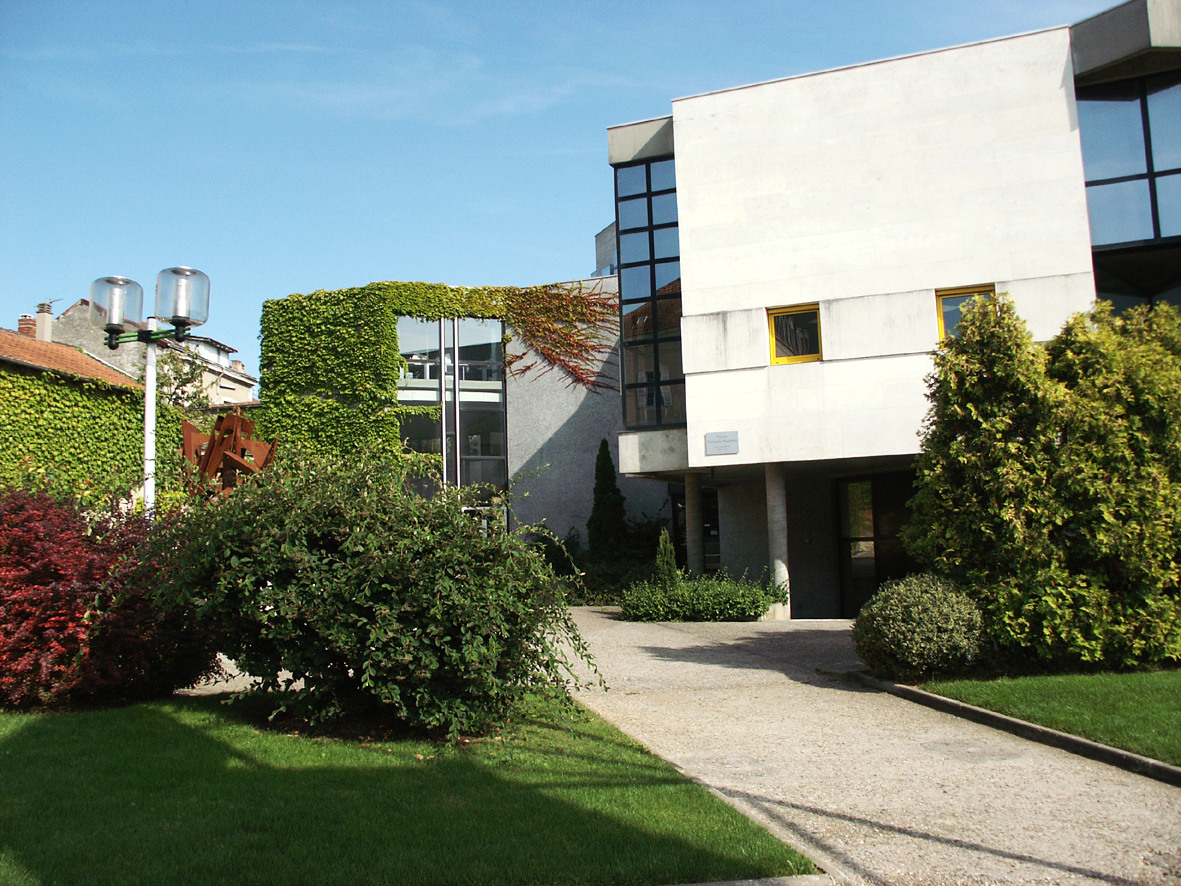
- The media library seen from Avenue Georges Pompidou.
- Location: 12 Georges Pompidou Avenue, Périgueux, France
- Established: 1988
- Service area: 13,500 m²

Collection
- Size: 1,080,000 documents (est.)

Access and use
- Members: 4,930 in 2014

The Pierre-Fanlac Media Library, formerly the municipal library of Périgueux until 2015, is a classified library located in Périgueux in the Dordogne department of France. It comprises a central facility on Avenue Georges-Pompidou and three annexes situated in the neighborhoods of Saint-Georges, Le Toulon, and Gour de l'Arche.

The library is served by lines A and C of Péribus, the municipal bus network.

== History ==
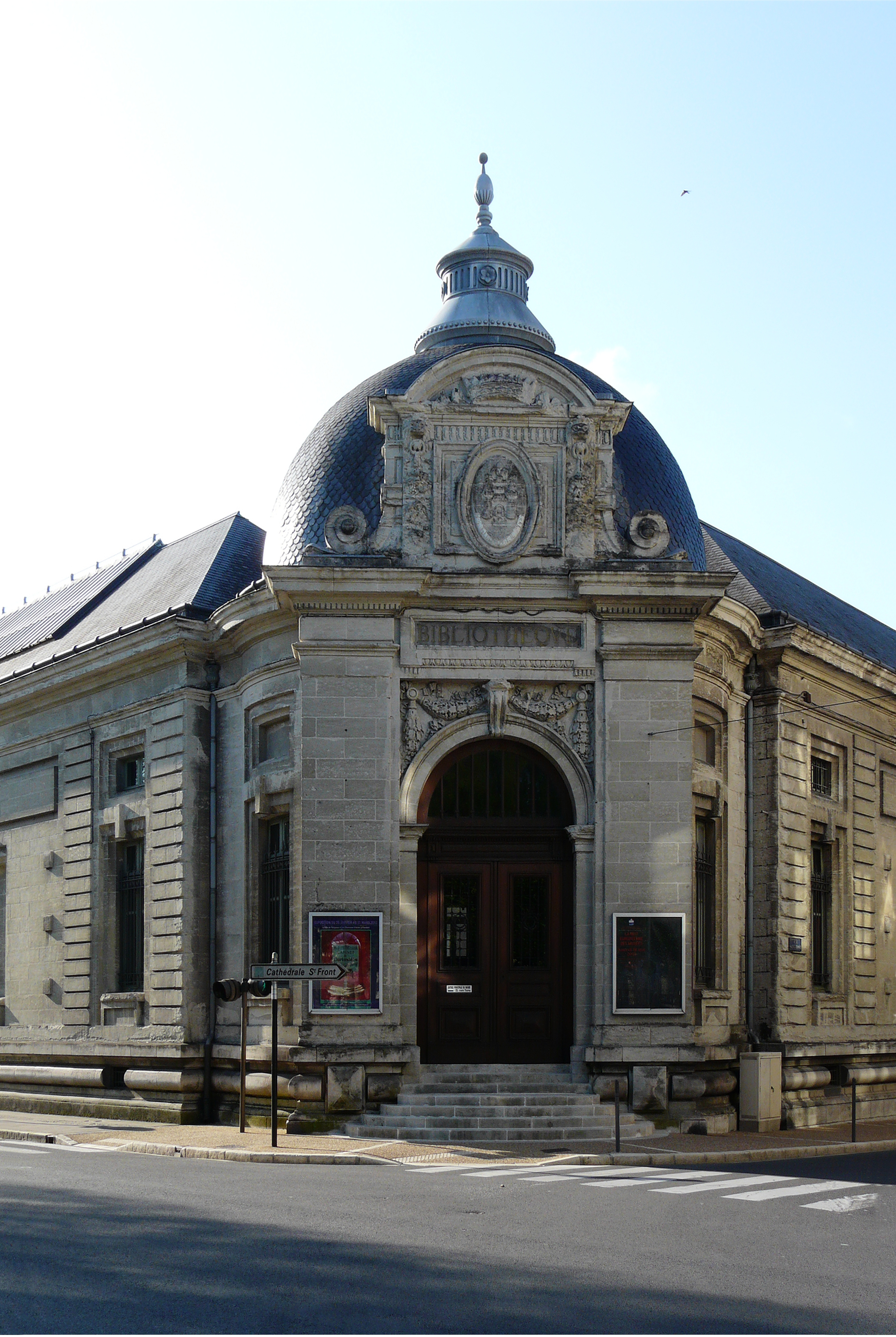
The entrance to the old library, adjacent to the museum, at the corner of Cours Tourny and Rue Saint-Front.

By a municipal decision in 1781, the first municipal library of Périgueux was established. It opened to the public in 1809 in the former bishopric building on Place de la Clautre. Its initial holdings included the collections of the Literary Society of Périgueux (1780, dissolved in 1781) and, in particular, those of the Central School of the Dordogne department, abolished in 1804. In 1898 the library was relocated to the Museum-Library at the corner of Cours Tourny and Rue Saint-Front. In 1988 it moved to its current premises at 12–14 Avenue Georges-Pompidou, which was inaugurated by Jacques Valade, Minister of Higher Education and Research, and the academician Pierre Moinot.

The library commissioned Marc Monnier, a painter and sculptor from Périgueux, to create the geometric metal sculpture that decorates its entrance facing Avenue Georges-Pompidou.

On 30 August 2014, after a year of renovation work, the Gour de l'Arche annex library, located in the neighborhood's community center, reopened to the public.

Following a municipal council decision in September 2013, the library was named after Pierre Fanlac, a writer, publisher, and printer from Périgueux. In January 2015, a plaque was installed, and it officially became the "Pierre-Fanlac Media Library."

Closed in August 2018 for renovations, including two extensions on the ground floor and improvements to accessibility and energy performance, the media library reopened in September 2019. In 2014, the number of members accessing the library was estimated to be 4930.

== Administration ==
The directors who have served since 1992 are:

Period	Director's name	Ref.
1992-1997	Thierry Grognet	
1997-2013	Jean-Louis Glénisson	
2013-2021	Jean-Marie Barbiche	
2021-	Anne-Sophie Lambert	

== Collections ==
In 2010 the Périgueux library held a heritage collection consisting of more than 300 manuscripts, 62 incunabula, and approximately 45,000 printed volumes. It also holds 185 books that belonged to Queen Marie-Antoinette, originating from her library at the Petit Trianon. In 2014, the municipal library's entire collection comprised 112,768 books and periodicals for adults, 32,310 books for children, 286 active press subscriptions, 22,000 cassettes and CDs, 1,000 musical scores, more than 4,000 DVDs, and various online resources.

An online catalog allows users to search the main collections. The Périgord and early collections are only partially indexed in this catalog. A portion of the manuscripts is listed in the "general catalog of manuscripts" of the National Library of France, as are two 19th-century scholarly collections: the Lapeyre and Pellisson collections.

== Gallery ==
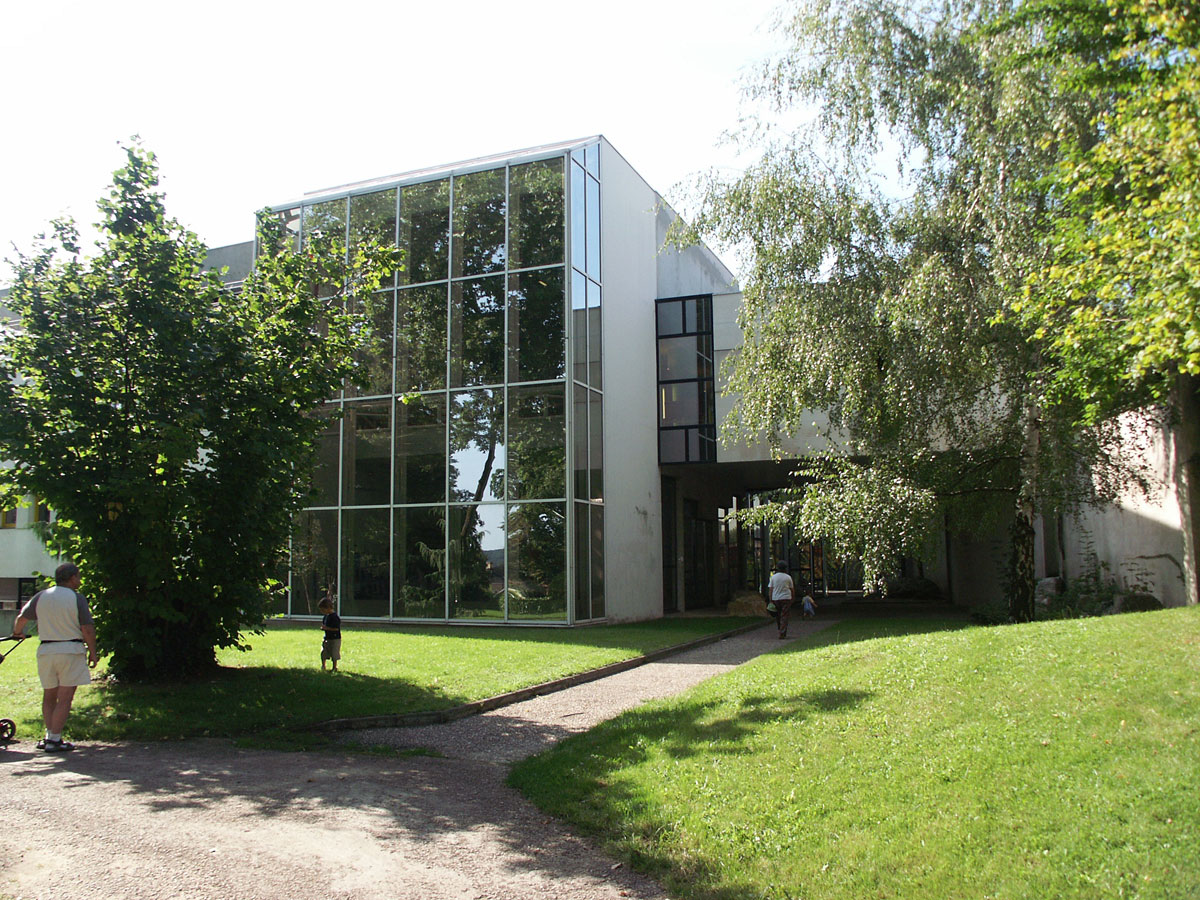
The library seen from the garden side, Gamenson Park.

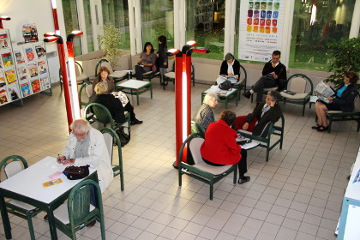
Library lobby.

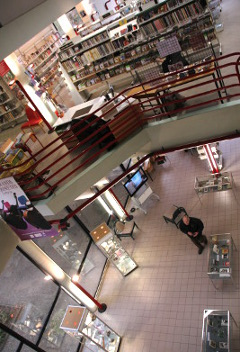
Library lobby.

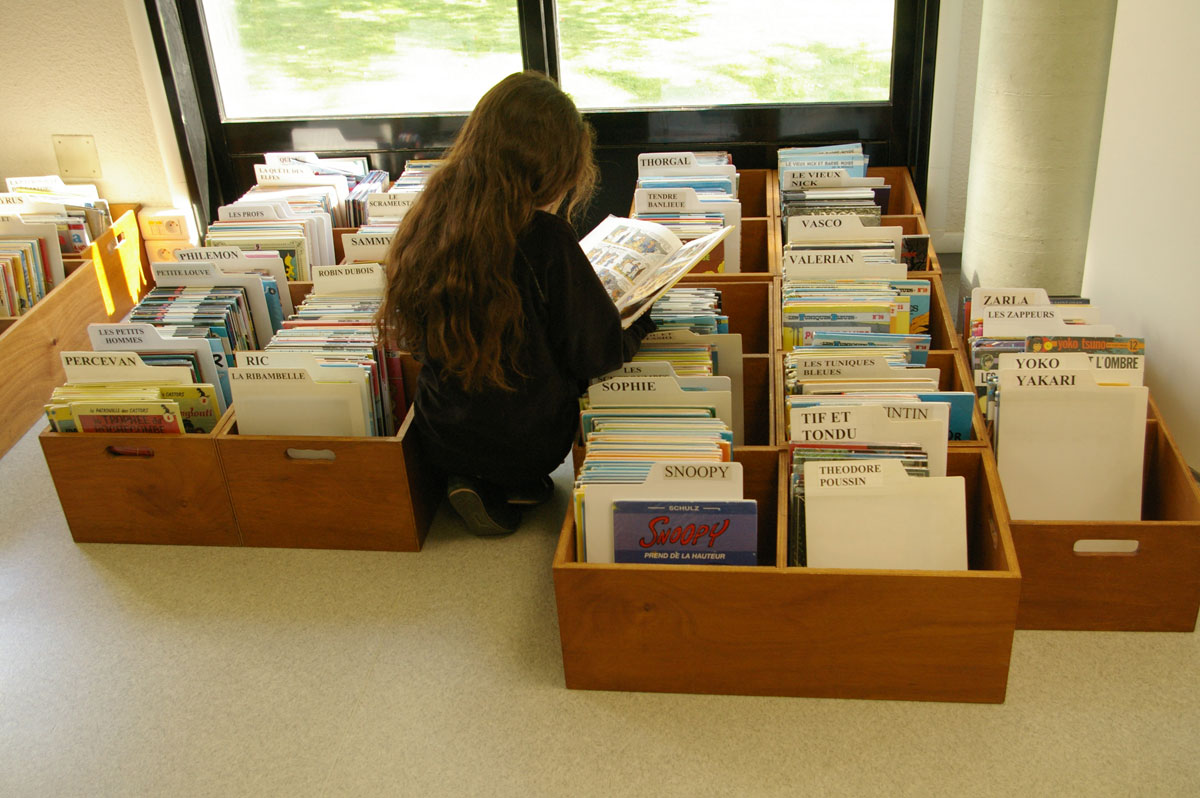
The children's section of the library.

== See also ==
- Bibliothèque nationale de France
- List of libraries in France
- Périgueux

== Bibliography ==
- Catalogues régionaux des incunables des bibliothèques publiques de France [Regional catalogs of incunabula in French public libraries]. Histoire et civilisation du livre (in French). Vol. 4. Société Bibliophiles Guyenne. 1984. pp. 365–367. ISBN 2-904532-01-3.
