= Lectionary 263 =

Greek manuscript of the New Testament

Lectionary ℓ 263
- New Testament manuscript
- Text: Evangelistarium
- Date: 12th century
- Script: Greek
- Now at: Bibliothèque municipale de Besançon
- Size: 26.4 cm by 20 cm
- Note: musical notes

Lectionary 263, designated by siglum ℓ 263 (in the Gregory-Aland numbering), is a Greek manuscript of the New Testament, on parchment. Palaeographically it has been assigned to the 12th century. Scrivener labelled it as 193^{e}, Gregory by 158^{e}. The manuscript has complex contents.

== Description ==
The codex contains lessons from the Gospel of John, Matthew, and Luke (Evangelistarium).

The text is written in Greek large minuscule letters, on 210 parchment leaves (26.4 cm by 20 cm), in two columns per page, 22 lines per page. The initial letters are rubricated; it contains musical notes.

The manuscript contains weekday Gospel lessons from Easter to Pentecost and Saturday/Sunday Gospel lessons for the other weeks.

== History ==
Gregory dated the manuscript to the 13th century. It has been assigned by the Institute for New Testament Textual Research to the 12th century.

The manuscript was added to the list of New Testament manuscripts by Scrivener (number 193^{e}) and Gregory (number 263^{e}). Gregory saw the manuscript in 1885.

The manuscript is not cited in the critical editions of the Greek New Testament (UBS3).

The codex is housed at the Bibliothèque municipale de Besançon (Ms. 45) in Besançon.

== See also ==
- List of New Testament lectionaries
- Biblical manuscript
- Textual criticism

== Bibliography ==
- Gregory, Caspar René (1900). Textkritik des Neuen Testaments, Vol. 1. Leipzig. p. 409.
