= Médiathèques de Saint-Étienne =

Saint-Etienne Public Libraries
- Médiathèques de Saint-Etienne
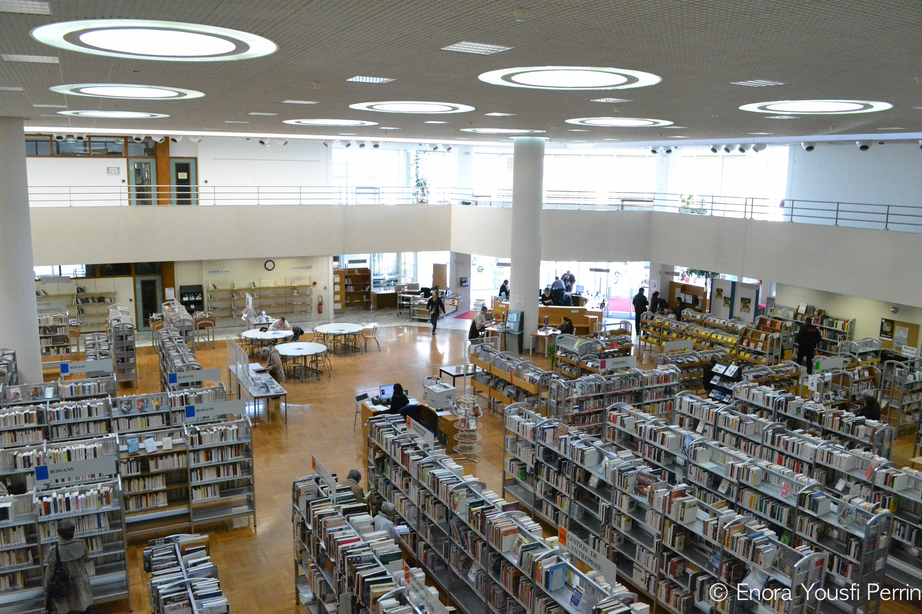
- 45.43581972082562°N 4.380851939992615°E
- Location: Saint-Etienne, France
- Established: 1993; 33 years ago

Collection
- Size: 527 000 documents

Other information
- Director: François Marin
- Website: www.mediatheques.saint-etienne.fr

The médiathèques municipales de Saint-Étienne is a group of libraries in Saint-Étienne, France. It consists of a central library located in the Tarentaize area, six smaller libraries and two bookmobiles. The libraries hold more than 527 000 documents. Each year, close to one million documents are borrowed by about 15 000 users.

== History ==
The library gathered its first documents during the French Revolution, when the libraries of the clergy were seized. At the time, these books and manuscripts were stored but not made available to the public. In 1831, the collections were moved to the city hall, where the population was allowed to consult them one day a week from 1834 onwards.

In 1842, Jean-Antoine de la Tour-Varan became the city librarian and expanded the collection holdings, causing the library to move to the Palais des Arts in 1861, where it remained until 1959. Throughout the 19th century, the different librarians made it a priority to acquire as many documents about the local region of Forez as possible, leading to the opening of a room dedicated to local literature and books about local history in 1889.

At the beginning of the 20th century, the lack of room to store and display the documents became a critical issue, which was not solved by the enlargement of the Palais des Arts in 1919. Therefore, in 1959 the library was moved to the Hôtel Colcombet and became open to the public every day of the week.

After World War II, following a nationwide movement of libraries trying to come closer to the population, the library of Saint-Étienne opened its first annex in Beaulieu in 1966, and launched a bookmobile in 1968.

In the 1980s and the 1990s, other annexes were opened and the central library moved to its current location in Tarentaize in 1993.

== Libraries ==
The library network consists of a central library in Tarentaize, six smaller libraries and two bookmobiles.

=== Médiatheque de Tarentaize ===
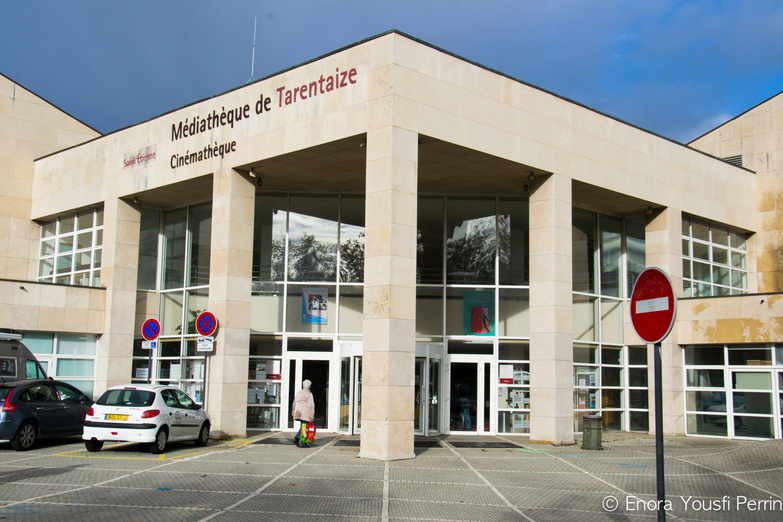
The central library of Tarentaize

The central library of Tarentaize was designed by Danish architect Henning Larsen in collaboration with the architectural firm Arch from Saint Etienne. They used the same blueprints that the library of Gentofte, Denmark, was built upon. The library of Tarentaize opened to the public on 19 October 1993.

At 6000 sq m, it is the largest library in Saint-Étienne. The collections are located on the first floor, while the offices and an exhibition space are located on the second floor. The library of Tarentaize also houses the Cinematheque of Saint-Étienne.

=== Smaller libraries ===
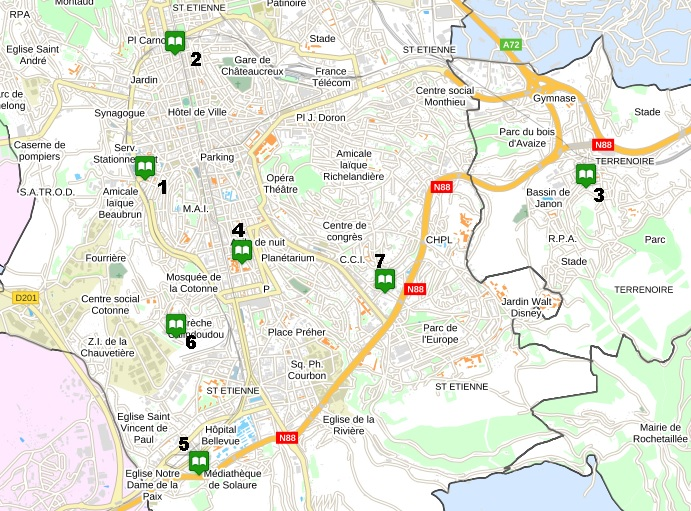
1. Library of Tarentaize; 2. Library of Carnot; 3. Library of Terrenoire; 4. Library of Tréfilerie; 5. Library of Solaure; 6. Library of La Cotonne; 7. Library of Beaulieu

Library	Opening	Size(sq m)	Seats	Opening hours per week
Tarentaize	1993	7,618	349	37.5
Carnot	1984	600	40	25
Terrenoire	1988	381	30	24.5
Tréfilerie	1993	232	20	23
Solaure	1983	174	9	9.5
La Cotonne	1980	170	20	16.5
Beaulieu	1966	125	30	18.5

=== Bookmobiles ===
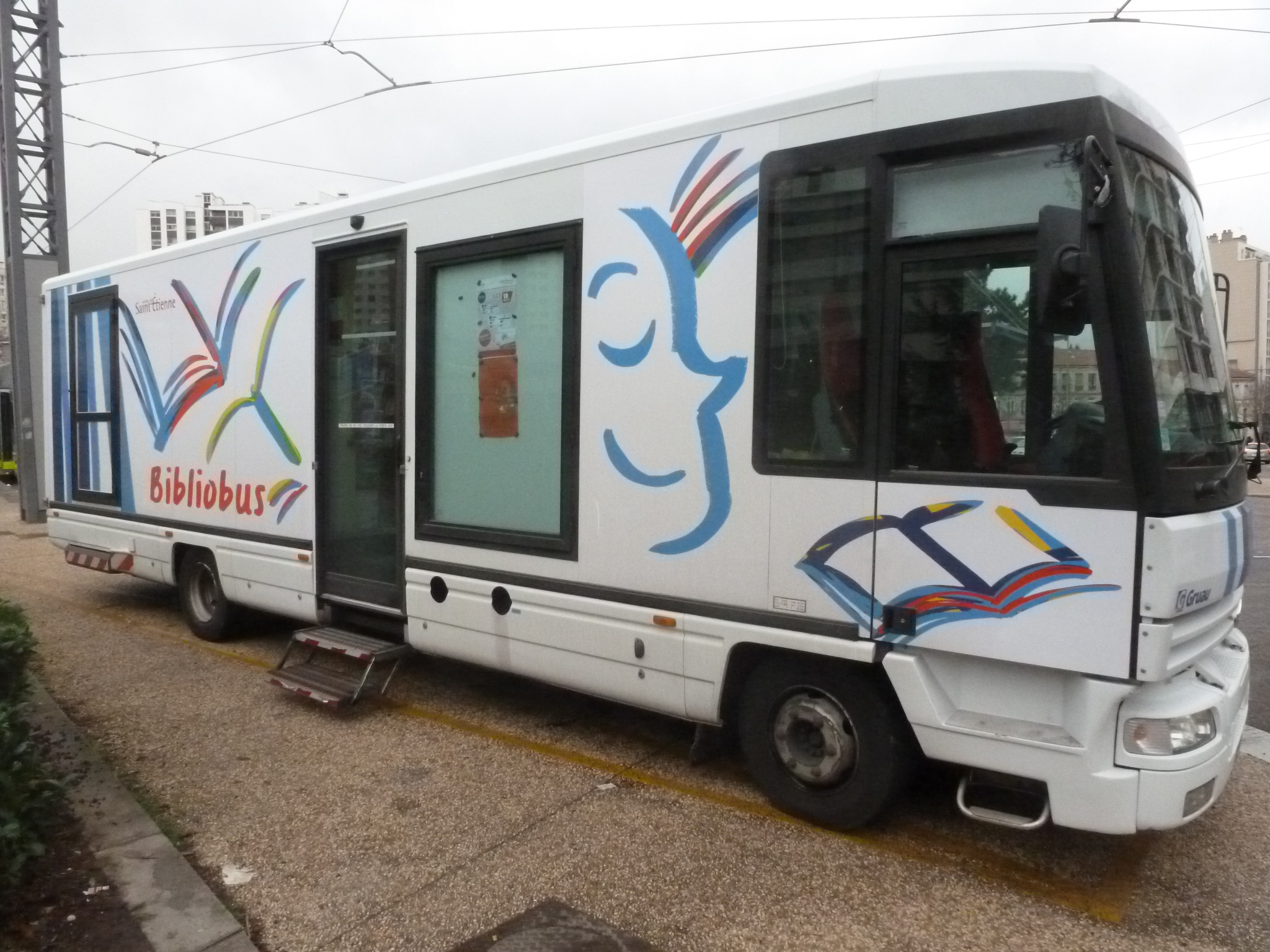
A bookmobile of Saint-Etienne

Bookmobiles were launched in 1968 in order to grant the population an easier access to culture. Two vehicles currently exist : one intended for the youth and the other one for adults, which has slightly changed over the years and is now targeting all audiences. These two bookmobiles tour the areas which are deprived of library buildings, with the youth bookmobile also visiting schools.

== Collections ==
The central library of Tarentaize and the smaller libraries all hold both youth and adult collections, except the library of Solaure, which collections are solely youth-oriented. The library of Tarentaize also manages patrimonial collections, including about 6 000 books published before 1810. Since the 19th century, the library has been collecting and curating as many works about the Forez and its history as possible, including books written by authors born in Forez. For example, the library owns a collection of original sheet music of composer Jules Massenet's works. The library also holds an important collection about industrial history and mineralogy, stemming from the industrial history of the city of Saint-Étienne. A process of digitization of these collections has also begun, starting with old postcards and photographs from Saint-Étienne and its region, and ancient manuscripts.

== Cultural action ==
The libraries of Saint-Étienne hold many diverse cultural exhibitions, including readings, conferences with guest authors, concerts or other shows. They also work closely with the Cinematheque for film projections. The library of Tarentaize also has an exhibition space on its second floor. They also participate in the annual Fête du Livre in Saint-Étienne. On this occasion, they take part in the Heure du Conte, which is storytelling for children, and they also organize youth literary awards.

== Services ==
The libraries de Saint-Étienne are part of the Brise network (Bibliothèques en Réseau Informatisé de Saint-Étienne). The Brise network was created in 1988 and aimed at gathering all the holdings from close to 40 public and college libraries of Saint-Étienne in two online catalogs.

The public libraries of Saint-Étienne also have implemented a shuttle system in 2011, thanks to which a user who has borrowed documents can return them in any of the libraries, including the bookmobiles. The central library of Tarentaize provides a service dedicated to teaching users about multimedia technology, for example how to use the Internet or word processors.

Since January 2016, the library has launched an e-book lending service. Its e-book catalog currently holds 167 digital books. The library also grants access to 1D Touch, which is a streaming platform which offers independent cultural content. By this means, library users can listen to about 1 million music tracks.

== Cinématheque ==
The library of Tarentaize is also home to the Cinematheque of Saint-Etienne, which is one of the oldest cinematheques in France. This is the only occurrence in France of a cinematheque being located within the public library's walls.

== List of curators ==
- 1831–1842: Auguste Brun
- 1842–1864: Jean-Antoine de la Tour-Varan
- 1864–1866: pas de bibliothécaire
- 1866–1870: Ephrem Candy
- 1870–1873: no librarian
- 1873–1874: Javelin Pagnon
- 1874–1881: Claude-Philippe Testenoire-Lafayette
- 1881–1888: Jean-Baptiste Galley
- 1888–1896: J-M Canel et Joseph Maissiat
- 1896–1906: Joseph Maissiat
- 1906–1947: Pierre Lévêque
- 1947–1950: P. Julian
- 1950–1955: F. Ménard
- 1955–1965: Mauricette Simon
- 1966–1986: Annie Monginoux
- 1986–1991: François Larbre
- 1992–present: François Marin

== See also ==
- List of libraries in France
