= Jean-Baptiste Boisot =

French abbot, bibliophile and scholar

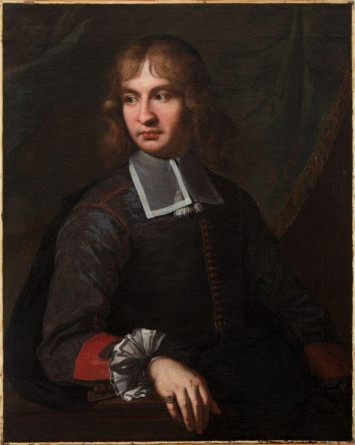
- Portrait of Abbé Jean-Baptiste Boisot, 1676, oil on canvas by Cesare Fiori, Museum of Fine Arts and Archeology.
- Born: July 1638; Besançon, Kingdom of France
- Died: 4 December 1694 (aged 56)
- Occupation: Abbot

Jean-Baptiste Boisot (July 1638 – 4 December 1694) was a French Benedictine Abbot, bibliophile, and scholar. He founded the first French museum on his death in 1694 when he bequeathed his personal collection of artwork and manuscripts to the Benedictine monks of Saint-Vincent, Besançon. This collection became the Besançon Municipal Library.

== Early life ==
Jean-Baptiste Boisot was the third son of Claude Boisot II, a merchant banker who was governor of the imperial city of Besançon from 1652 to 1658. At the end of the sixteenth century, the Boisot family was ennobled, then attained high-ranking church positions with the help of François-Michel le Tellier, Marquis de Louvois.

Boisot was thirteen years old when he left his hometown to study civil and canon law in Dole.

== Travels ==
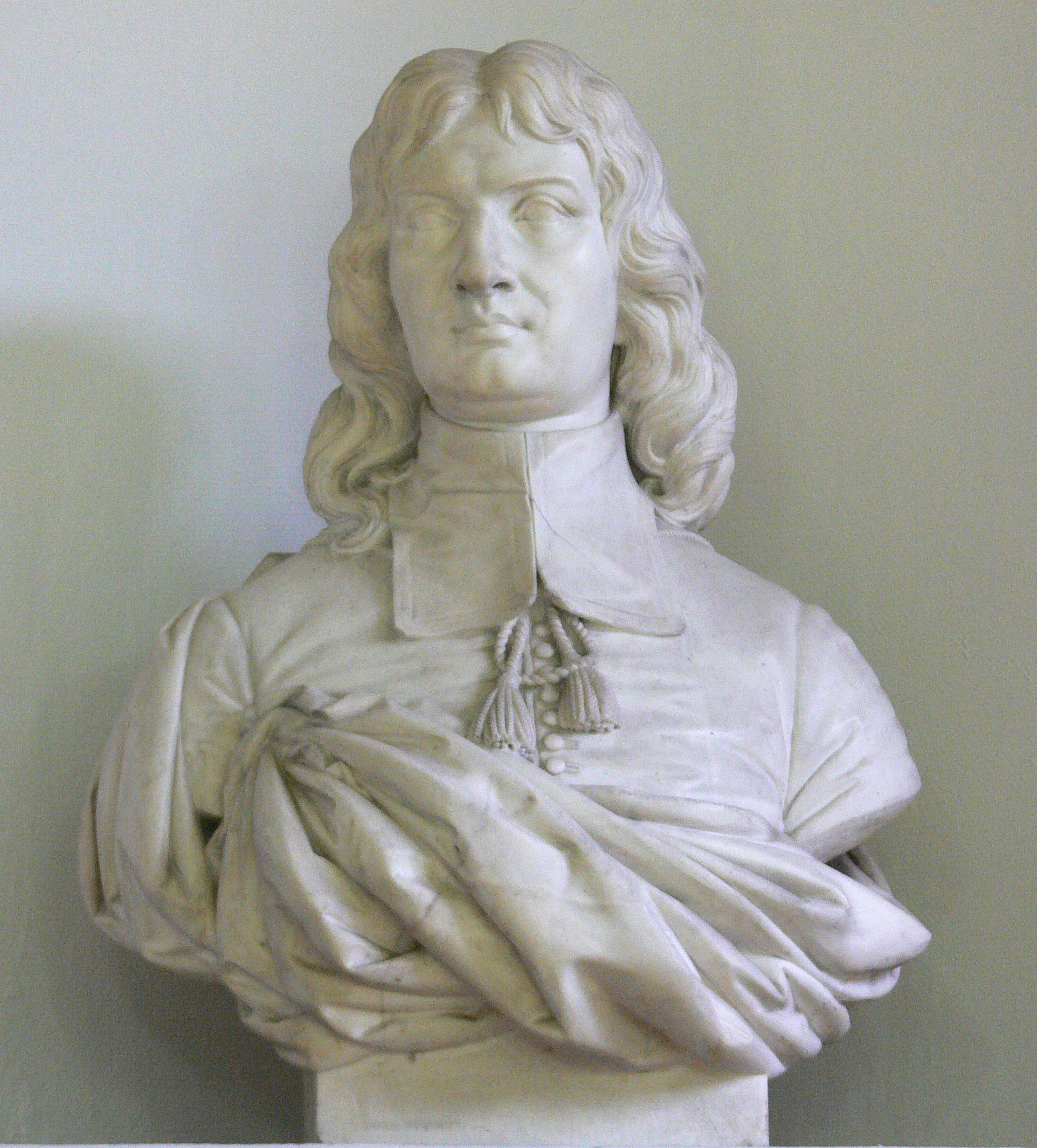
Jean-Baptiste Boisot by French sculpture Jean Claude Petit (1819–1903)

Boisot was sent on a mission to Milan, Northern Italy, to the Marquis of Mortar, then governor of Milan, to negotiate with him sending reinforcements. Meanwhile, the peace of Aix-la-Chapelle was signed, and the king restored the Franche-Comté. It is for this reason that Boisot exiled himself and left Savoy in 1673 and Italy in 1674. He remained in Spain, preferring to stay in Madrid, studying at the Escorial Library until 1678. During these travels he collected a great number of paintings, medals, bronzes, and of other fine art.

== The Abbey of Saint-Vincent ==
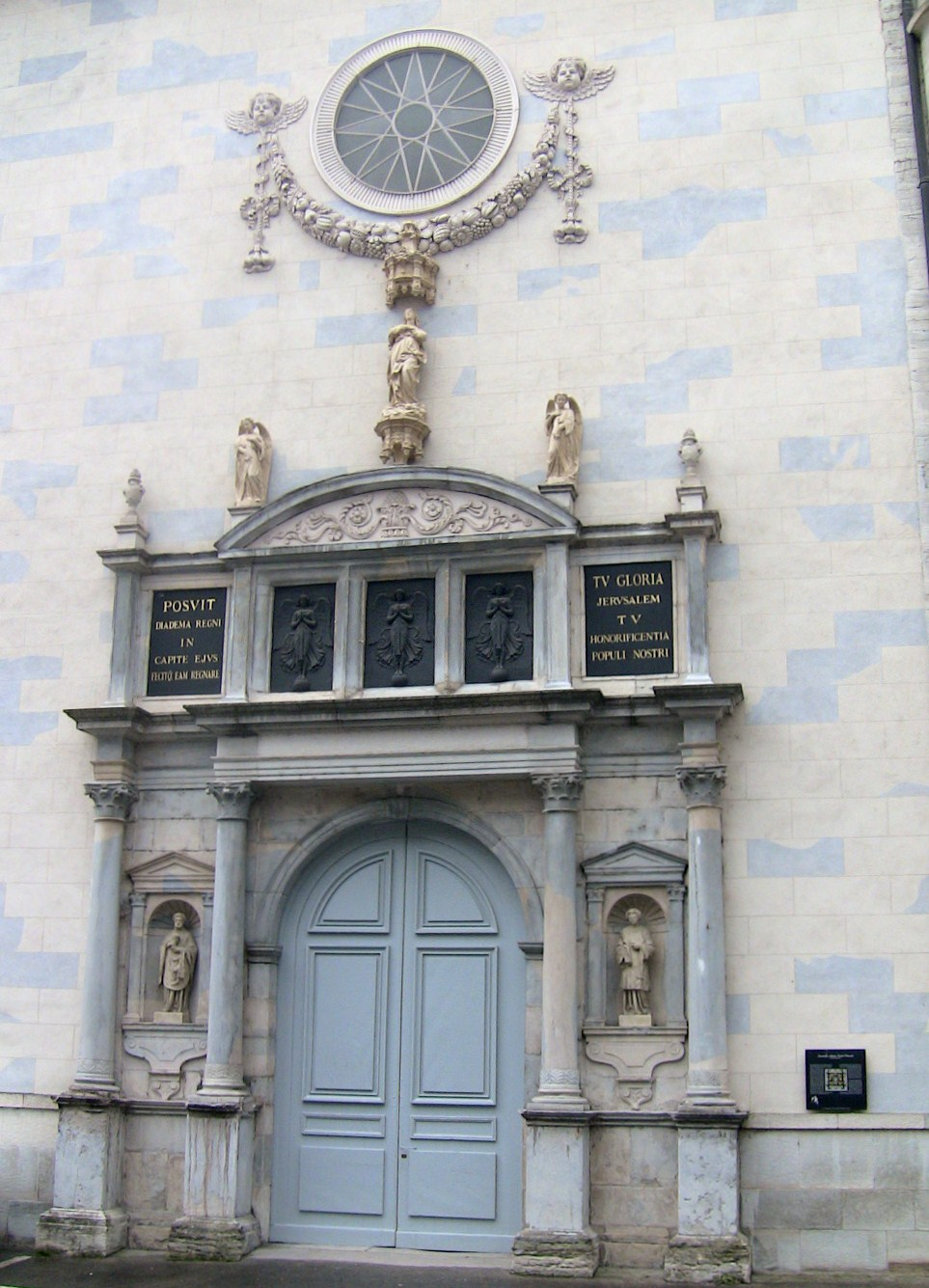
Abbaye Saint-Vincent de Besançon

Louis XIV made him abbot of the Benedictine Abbey of Saint-Vincent Besançon on his return.

== Death ==
Boisot died on 4 December 1694, at the age of fifty-six, at his abbey. He bequeathed to his hometown of Besançon its most valuable asset, its library.

== Library ==
Boisot's will of 1694 established the Besançon Municipal Library under the control of the Benedictines of Saint Vincent. This is the first example of a private collection in France being converted into a public collection, and is often cited as the first French museum. Boisot's bequest required that the city maintain and provide free access to the collection. The collection includes his papers of cardinal Antoine Perrenot de Granvelle and his correspondence with Madeleine de Scudéry.
