= List of libraries in France =

This is a partial list of libraries in France.

== Libraries by region ==
=== Auvergne-Rhône-Alpes ===
- Bibliothèque Clermont Université, Clermont-Ferrand
- Bibliothèque du Patrimoine de Clermont Auvergne Métropole
- Bibliothèque municipale de Grenoble
- Bibliothèque municipale de Lyon
- Bibliothèque Municipale de Riom
- Claude Bernard University Lyon 1 Library
- Jean Monnet University Libraries, Saint-Étienne
- Médiathèques de Saint-Étienne
- Université Grenoble Alpes
  - Bibliothèque Jean-Pierre Demailly
  - Bibliothèque universitaire Droit-Lettres de Grenoble

=== Bourgogne-Franche-Comté ===
- Bibliothèque municipale de Besançon
- Library of Gray

=== Brittany ===
- Brest municipal library
- Les Champs Libres, Rennes

=== Centre-Val de Loire ===
- Chartres Municipal Library (see also: May 1944 Chartres Municipal Library Fire)
- Tours municipal library

=== Corsica ===
- Bibliothèque Fesch, Ajaccio

=== Grand Est ===
- Bibliothèque municipale de Colmar
- Château de Commercy
- Bibliothèque multimédia intercommunale, Épinal, Vosges
- Bibliothèque municipale de Nancy
- Carnegie Library of Reims
- Humanist Library of Sélestat
- National Academic Library (Strasbourg)

=== Hauts-de-France ===
- Bibliothèque municipale de Douai
- Corbie Abbey, Picardy
- University of Lille libraries

=== Île-de-France ===
==== Elsewhere ====
- Maison des Sciences de l’Homme Mondes library, Nanterre
- Osmothèque library, Versailles
- University Gustave Eiffel Library, Marne-la-Vallée

=== Normandy ===
- University of Caen Normandy library
- University of Rouen library, Mont-Saint-Aignan

=== Nouvelle-Aquitaine ===
- Bibliothèque de Saint-Jean-d'Illac, Gironde
- Bordeaux municipal library
- Pierre-Fanlac Media Library, Périgueux
- University of Poitiers Library

=== Occitania ===
- Carré d'Art, Nîmes
- Bibliothèques de Toulouse
  - Médiathèque José Cabanis, Toulouse
- Séguier library, Nîmes, 18th c.

=== Overseas ===
- Bibliothèque Bernheim, Nouméa, New Caledonia
- Bibliothèque Franconie, Cayenne, French Guiana
- Schœlcher library, Fort-de-France, Martinique

=== Pays de la Loire ===
- Bibliothèque municipale de Nantes

=== Provence-Alpes-Côte d'Azur ===
- Aix-Marseille University Library
- Alcazar (Marseille)
- Bibliothèque Inguimbertine, Carpentras
- Bibliothèque Méjanes, Aix-en-Provence
- Cinémémoire, Amateur Film Library of Marseille

== See also ==
- Copyright law of France
- French literature
- Library associations in France
- List of archives in France
- Mass media in France
- Open access in France

in French

- Legal deposit in France (in French)
- Libraries in France (in French)
  - Classified municipal libraries in France (in French)
  - University libraries in France (in French)
