= May 1944 Chartres Municipal Library Fire =

26 May 1944 event in France

- Date: 26
- Type: Fire

The 26 May 1944 Chartres Municipal Library fire was a fire that destroyed or severely damaged more than 2000 manuscripts. It was the result of accidental bombing of the city centre during a US air raid.

== The Collection ==
Nearly two thousand manuscripts were destroyed or seriously damaged in the fire. The collection contained many medieval manuscripts of the School of Chartres from the Renaissance of the 12th century.

From the beginning of WWII, measures had been taken to protect the Chartres manuscripts. On September 5, 1939, they were crated and transported to the Château de Villebon, about twenty kilometers from the city, where they remained for over a year. But on December 3, 1940, Dr. Wermke, head of the library service for the German military administration, gave the order to return them to the municipal library. The Chartres municipality dragged its feet but was finally forced to comply: books and manuscripts were returned to their places. As air raids intensified in the weeks preceding the D-Day landings, fears grew that the library and its manuscripts would be damaged.

== The Fire ==
On May 26, 1944, at six o'clock in the evening, the inhabitants of Chartres heard the warning sirens. Soon, German anti-aircraft guns opened fire on a squadron of American aircraft. The bombing of the city subsequently occurred by accident after the commander of the squadron initiated bombs away; he was immediately imitated by the other aircraft who believed it was a deliberate maneuver.

The bombs hit the city centre, killing fifty people. The library was gutted, and a huge fire broke out. Within minutes, shelves, books, and manuscripts were ablaze. Rescue efforts were immediately organized. All available pumps were activated, the fire was brought under control, and most of the manuscripts were consumed by the fire. Many vellum manuscripts were bleached by the intense heat, transforming the parchment leaves into translucent strips like glass. Only a few manuscripts, then undergoing restoration at the Library, remained intact.

On June 8, a volunteer team set out to sort through the remains of the prestigious collection. The next day, a large number were sent to the Bibliothèque nationale de France's binding workshop, where the process lasted nearly four years: chemical means were used to separate the clumped sheets.

== Conservation ==
In total, 976 manuscripts survived the fire in some form. Maurice Jusselin and Canon Delaporte handled identification of the fragments. They identified and classified the manuscripts into four categories according to their state of preservation: 164 parchment manuscripts, of which 44 were in good condition and 32 were partially usable; 241 paper manuscripts, of which 118 were in good condition and 123 were partially usable. To the number of manuscripts that had partially survived destruction, was added those that had been the subject of microfiche or photographic reproductions before the war.

== The Collection Today ==
Many damaged bundles still await conservation and identification. Works by the likes of Bernard de Chartres, Thierry de Chartres, Guillaume de Conches, Bernard Silvestre and Gilbert de La Porrée remain unidentified amongst fragments of the collection.

== See also ==
- Chartres
- Chronologie des grands incendies
- List of libraries in France
