= Bibliothèque Fesch =

Municipal library in Ajaccio, Corsica

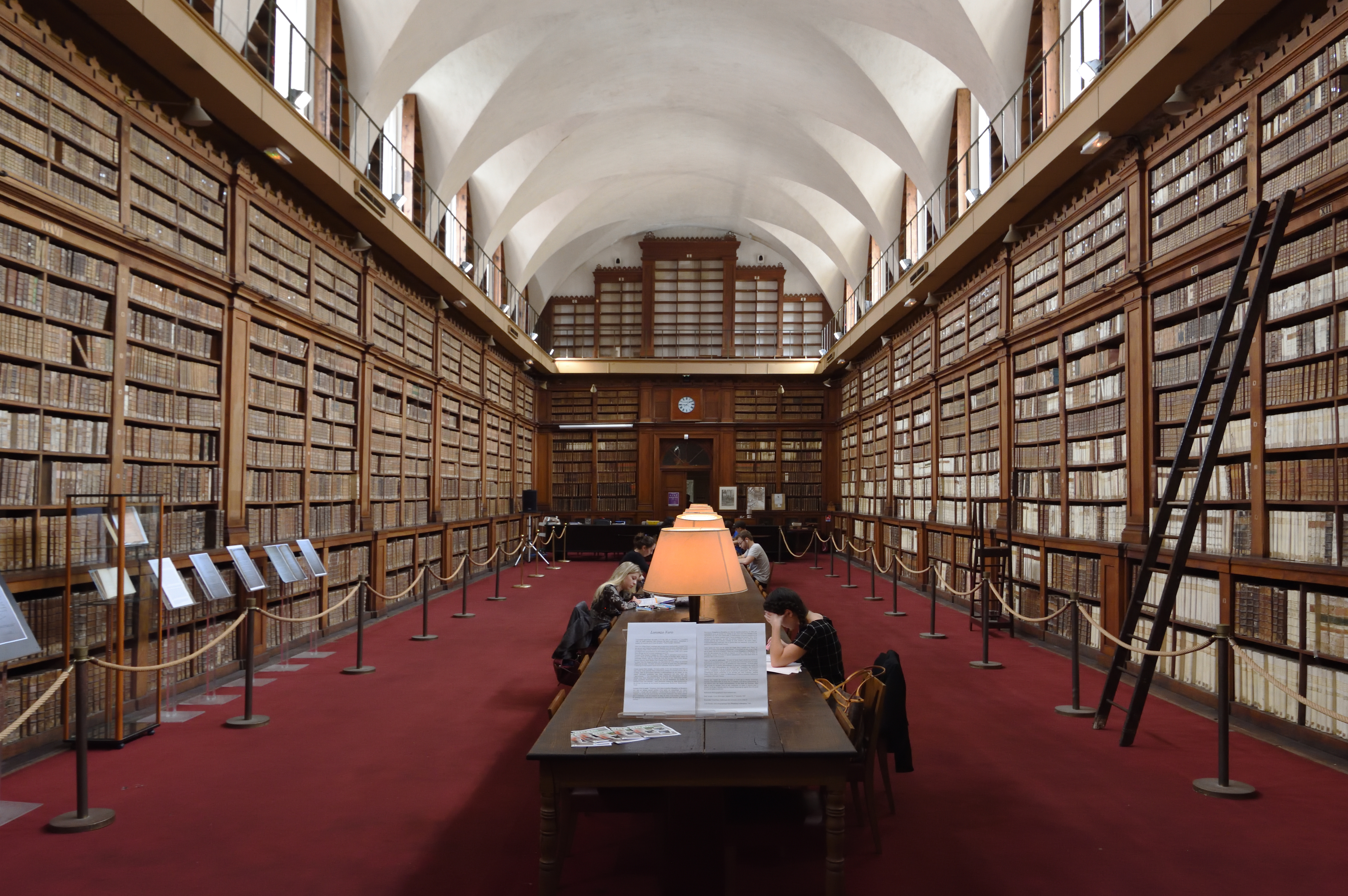
- 41°55′20″N 8°44′19″E
- Location: 50 Rue Cardinal Fesch, 20000 Ajaccio, Corsica
- Type: Public library
- Scope: Bibliothèque Municipale Classée
- Established: 14 May 1850
- Reference to legal mandate: Code général des collectivités territoriales, art. L 1422-2 & R 1422-2; Code du patrimoine, art. L 310-2

Collection
- Size: about 40000 works (including 220 medieval manuscripts and 25 incunables)

Other information
- Website: http://www.bibliotheque.ajaccio.fr/

The Bibliothèque Fesch is the municipal library of Ajaccio, in Corsica.

It is named after the Musée Fesch (Fesch Palace), of which it occupies the north wing.

Inaugurated on May 14, 1850, it was founded by Lucien Bonaparte in 1801 with an endowment of 12,310 books. With rare or even unique works, it has been listed as a Historic Monument since 13 September 13, 2011.

The library consists of three rooms, one of which is accessible to the public. The woodwork, shelving and reading tables are in walnut.

In 2019, the site was selected for the second edition of the heritage lottery.

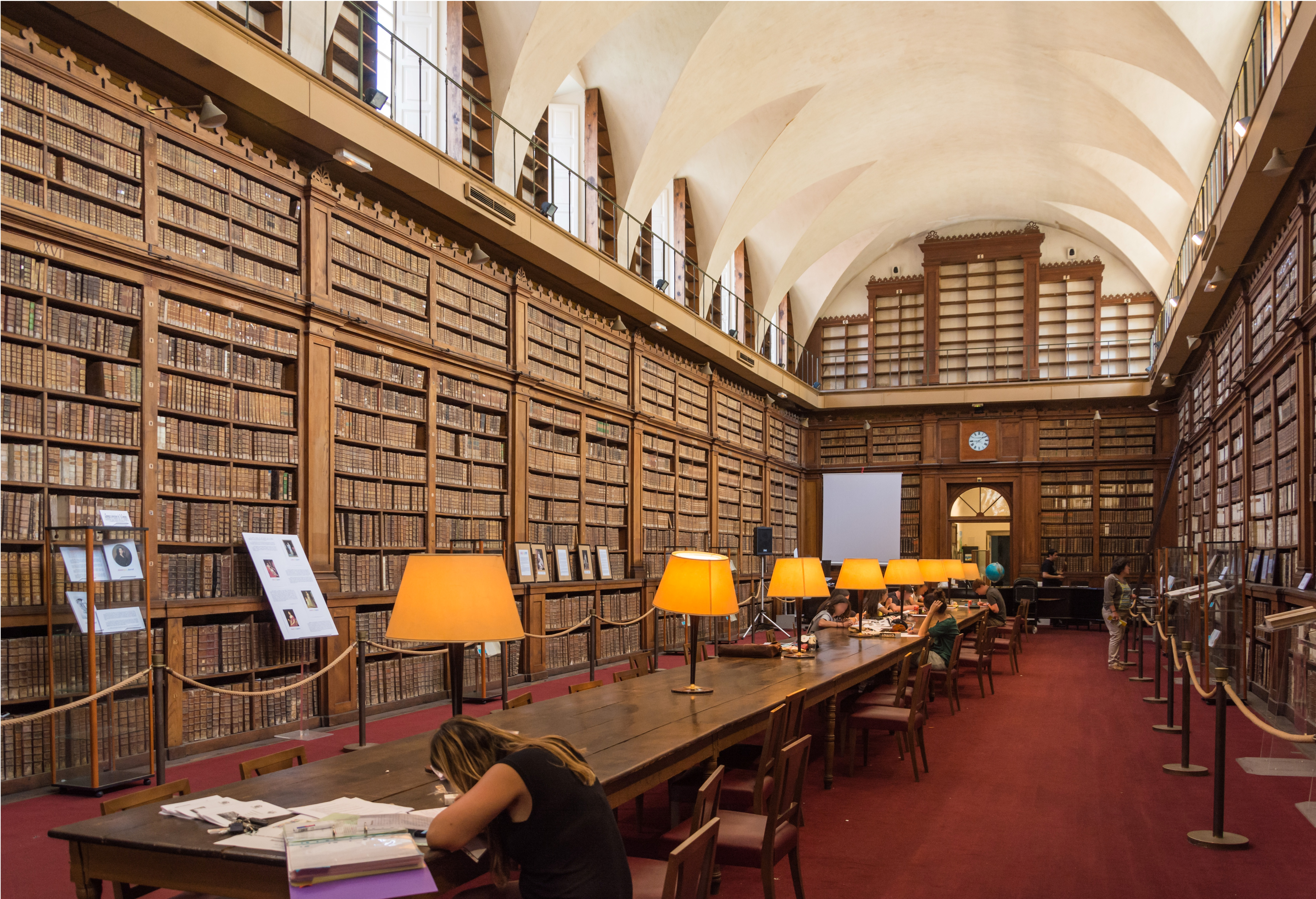
Bibliothèque Fesch.

== See also ==
- List of libraries in France
