= Médiathèque José Cabanis =

Coordinates: 43°36′36″N 1°27′18″E

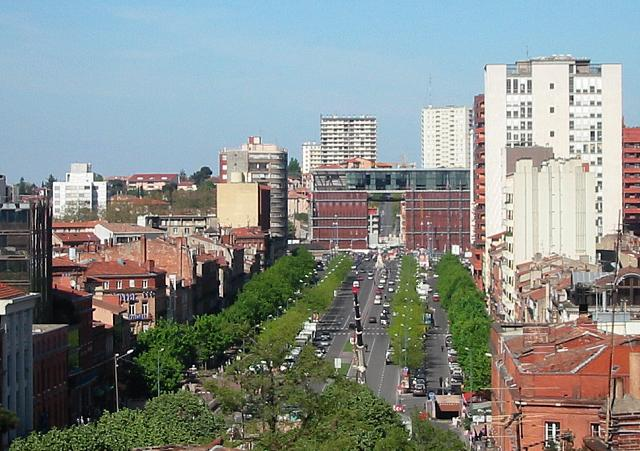
The Allées Jean-Jaurès and médiathèque José-Cabanis in the back

The Médiathèque José Cabanis is the main building of the Public Libraries of Toulouse. Situated next to the Matabiau rail station, it was built in 2002 by Buffi and named after José Cabanis, a poet who lived in Toulouse (1922–2000).

== See also ==
- List of libraries in France
