= Alcazar (Marseille) =

Former theatre and municipal library in Marseille

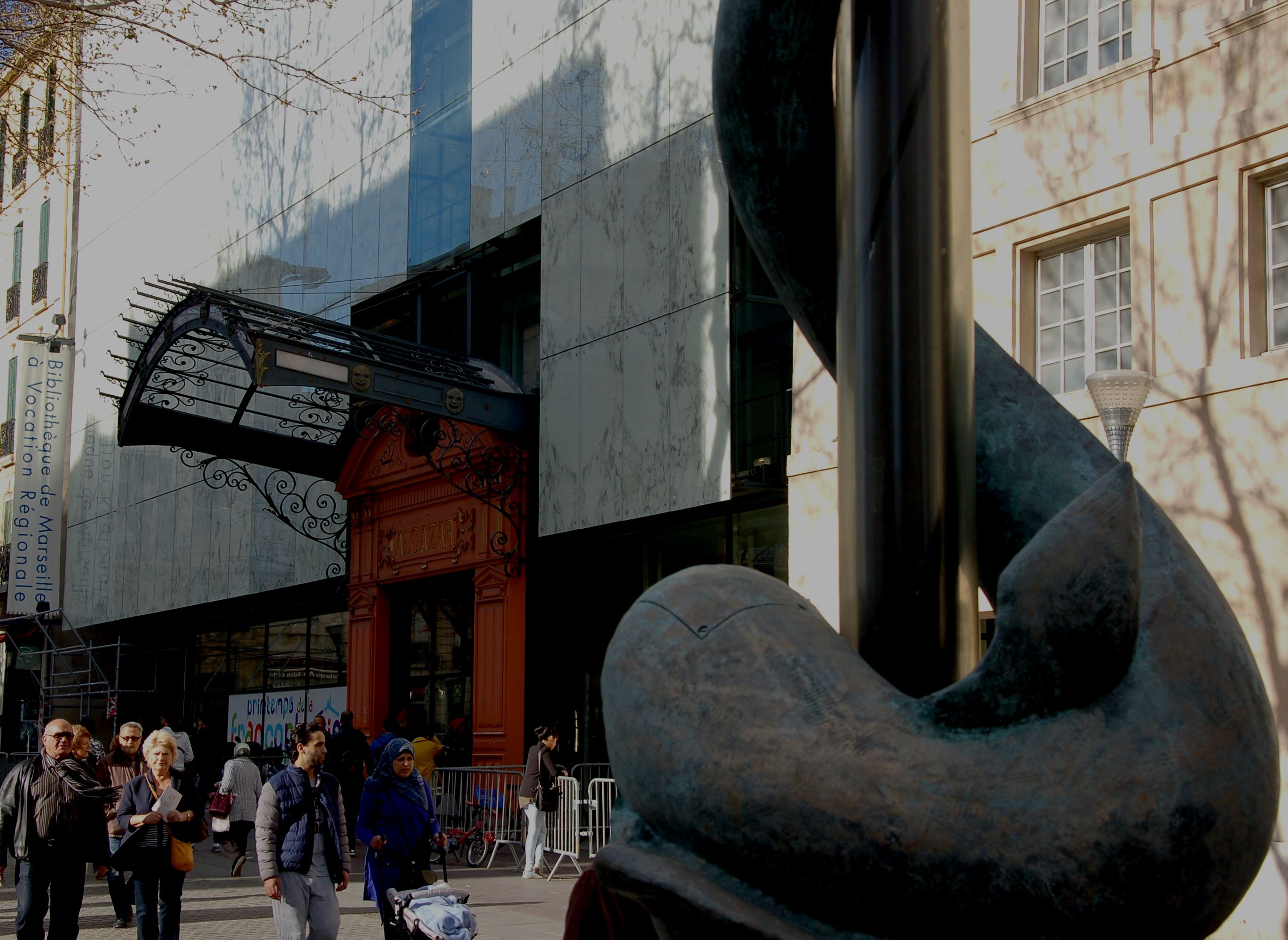
- View of the library from Cours Belsunce.
- Interactive map of the Alcazar area

General information
- Location: Marseille, France
- Coordinates: 43°17′56″N 5°22′36″E
- Year built: 1857

The Théâtre de l'Alcazar (Occitan: Teatre de l'Alcazar) was a famous theatre, founded in the mid-19th century, that was located in the heart of Marseille's Bourse district, on Cours Belsunce, near the Canebière. From the 1960s the site was gradually abandoned, before being converted into a municipal library in 2004.

== History ==
The Théatre de l'Alcazar Lyrique opened its doors on October 10, 1857. Inauguration festivities, attended by the town's notables, lasted two days before the public was admitted. The curiosity and envy of the public, heightened by the admiring comments of celebrities on the quality of the show and the service, gave excellent publicity to the hall, which its operators had no difficulty filling.

In keeping with the trends of the time, owner Étienne Demolins chose a "Moorish fantasy" style for his café-concert hall, inspired in particular by the Alhambra in Granada.

The theatre was built at great expense on a vast site on Cours Belsunce, behind the Old Port and the Palais de la Bourse, which had been the location of the stables of Transports Brousset, housing the horses of the company's then rail omnibuses and other horse-drawn carriages. With the creation of the Compagnie Générale des Omnibus de Marseille in 1856, the stables on Cours Belsunce and Allées de Noailles had been moved to Malpassé and Bonneveine.

The café-concert hall was built to accommodate 2,000 people, who could watch the show from their seats, while drinking and smoking. Above the hall, galleries led to the famous henhouse. Night parties and summer shows were held in the garden. In the 1860s, the Alcazar established its reputation by welcoming both Parisian celebrities and local artists. Its audiences soon acquired a reputation for having high standards. From 1868 to 1890, the Alcazar was a mecca for pantomime in Marseille, first with Charles Deburau (until 1871), then Louis Rouffe (from 1874 to 1885), and finally Séverin (full name Séverin Cafferra) until his departure for Paris.

A fire destroyed the theatre on June 25, 1873, but no one was hurt, and the theatre reopened four months later. On April 20, 1889, the Alcazar underwent a renovation that included the creation of the entrance door topped by a marquee which is still visible today and is listed as a Bâtiments de France building.

It was here that many famous French 20th-century artists either made their debuts (Yves Montand, Tino Rossi and others) or came to prominence (among them Dalida, Maurice Chevalier, Félix Mayol and Fernandel), but not all were so lucky, as Marseille's audiences had a reputation for being ruthless. The theatre was converted into a cinema in the early 1930s.

Kept closed during the Second World War, the theatre enjoyed a resurgence of activity after the Liberation. Still, with competition from television in the late 1950s, it first went through bankruptcy in 1964 before closing its doors for good on August 9, 1966. The building was then bought by a furniture dealer, subsequently offering the public only the remains of a decrepit Art Nouveau-style sign.

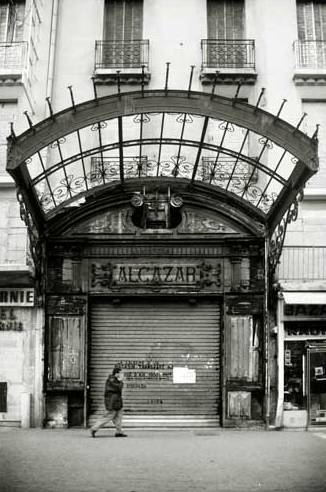
The entrance to the Alcazar before its conversion into a library

=== Library conversion ===
On March 30, 2004, the Alcazar reopened as a so-called municipal library with regional scope (abbreviated BMVR), replacing the Saint-Charles library. The project by architects Adrien Fainsilber and Didier Rogeon – drawn up in compliance with the piece of construction legislation of 12 July 1985 known as the MOP Act – sets out its "basic mission" as follows:

"To build a major library in the protected area of Marseille's historic centre is to create a major architectural event; an easily identifiable building that reflects its contents' specificity, modernity, and high-tech nature. Natural light floods the interior street; a glass roof covers its entire length; sunshades protect it and diffuse the light indirectly."

The press praised the event, noting that "of the 12 BMVRs in France, this is the largest in terms of public space ".

=== Difficulties ===
Beginning in December 2017, library staff attempted to use strike action to raise the alarm about the lack of resources and staff.

In 2023, the library was damaged by a fire caused by riots that started following the death of Nahel M.

== See also ==
- List of libraries in France

== Bibliography ==
- Pierre Echinard, "Vie et mort de l'Alcazar" (pp. 54–77), in Revue Marseille, No 204 "L'Alcazar à livre ouvert", March 2004.
