= Bibliothèque municipale de Colmar =

Library in Colmar, France

Coordinates: 48°4′34.68″N 7°21′40.54″E

The Bibliothèque municipale de Colmar is a library in Colmar, France.

== See also ==
- List of libraries in France
