= Bibliothèque municipale de Nancy =

Public library in Nancy, France

Coordinates: 48°41′31″N 6°10′44″E

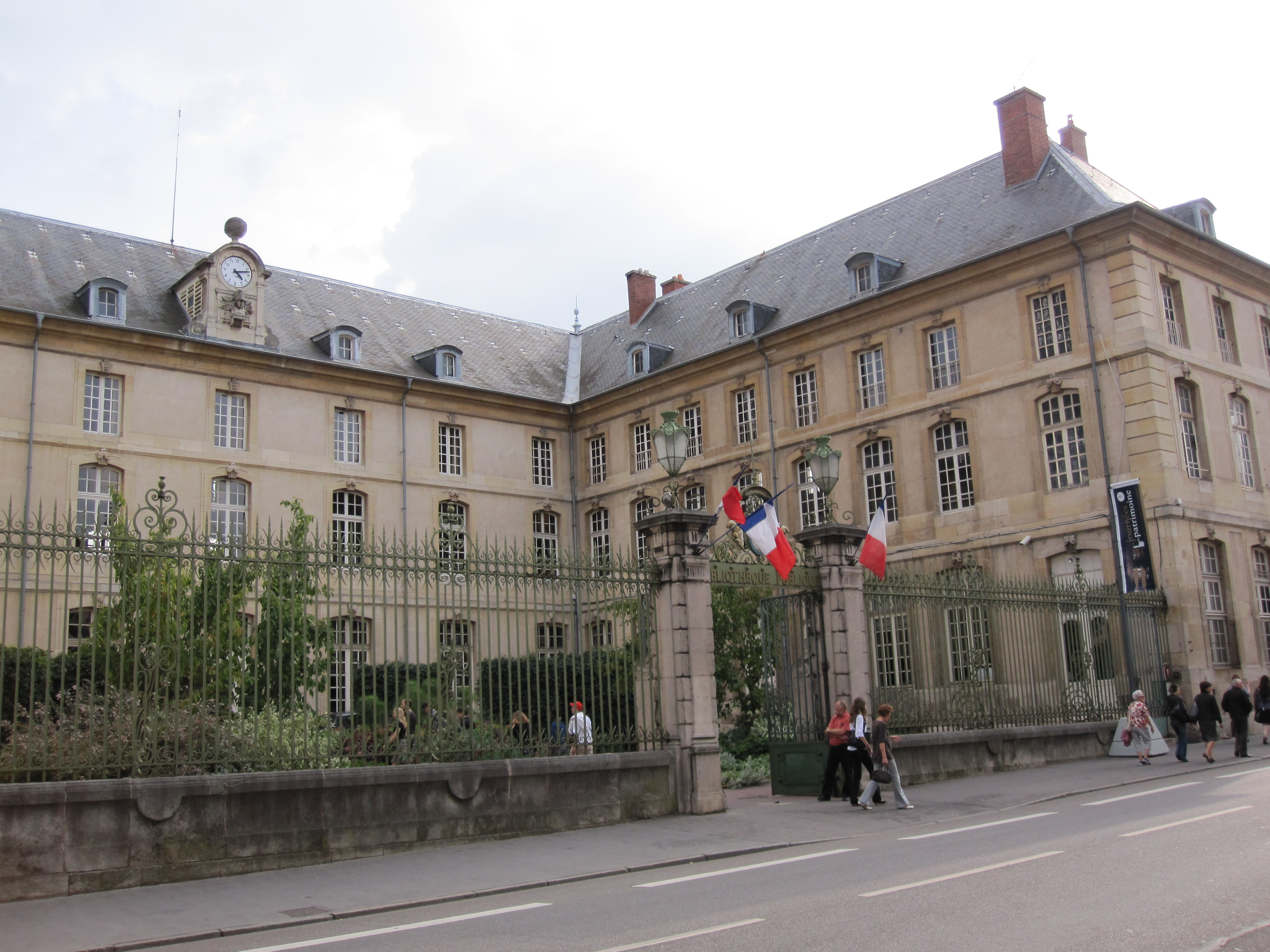
Public Library, Nancy, France, 2009

The Bibliothèque municipale de Nancy (est. 1750) is a public library in Nancy, France. It houses approximately 400,000 documents, books, maps, plans and prints. Polish king Stanisław Leszczyński began the collection in 1750. The library is located in a 1769 building of the historical University of Nancy. At 43, rue Stanislas, it is close to the Place Stanislas and the Gare de Nancy-Ville.

== See also ==
- Books in France
- List of libraries in France
