= Bibliothèque municipale de Grenoble =

Coordinates: 45°11′07″N 5°43′52″E

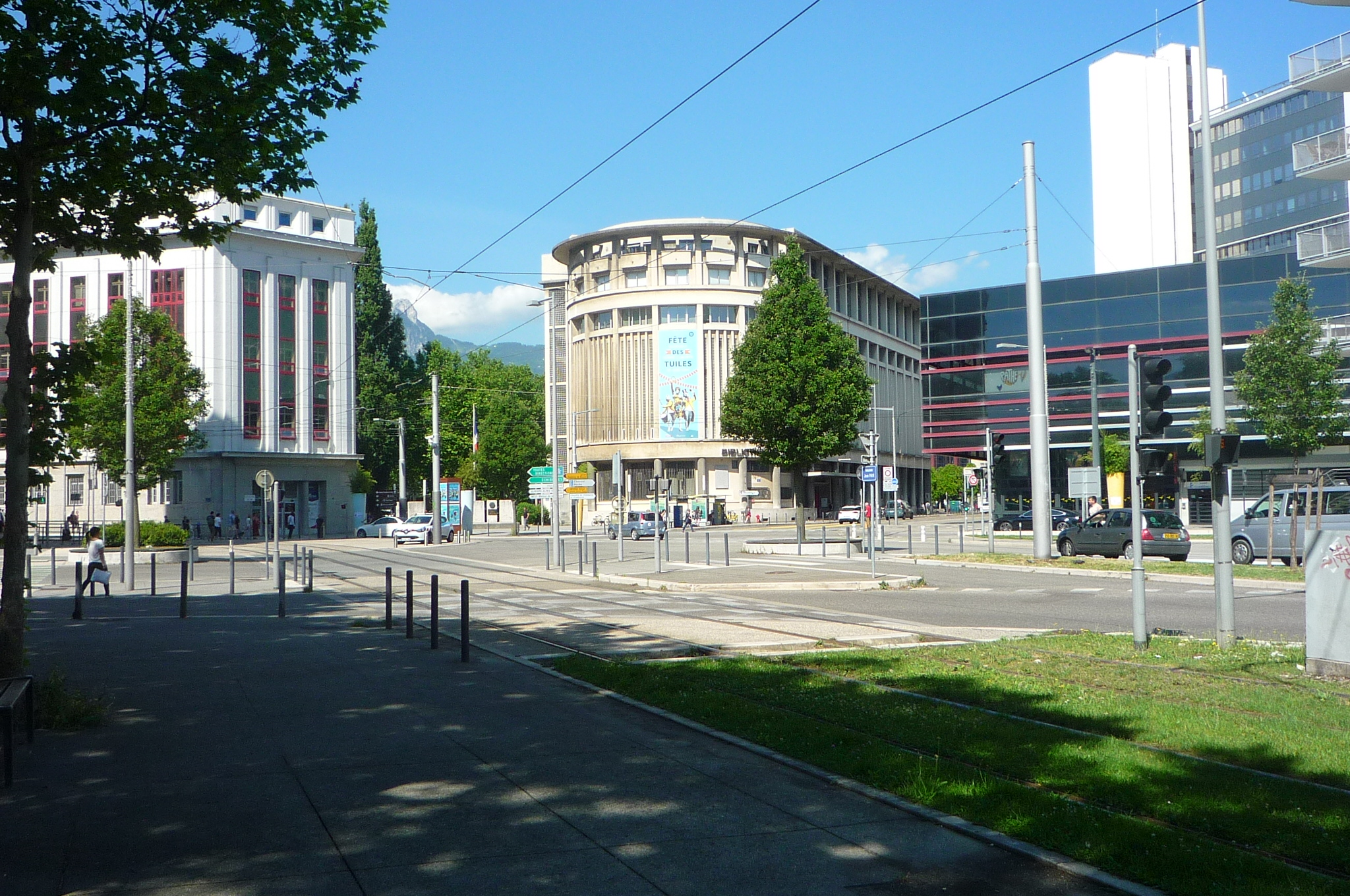
The library is in the center of the photo.

The Bibliothèque municipale de Grenoble is a library in Grenoble, France. It was founded in 1772, following the succession of Bishop, Jean de Caulet.

The current building located Boulevard Maréchal Lyautey was opened in January 1960 for the University and since 1970, for all audiences.

It houses more than 600,000 documents and 20,000 coins and medals.

== See also ==
- List of libraries in France
