= Bibliothèque municipale de Douai =

Library in Douai, France

Coordinates: 50.3677°N 3.0736°E

Bibliothèque Marceline Desbordes-Valmore
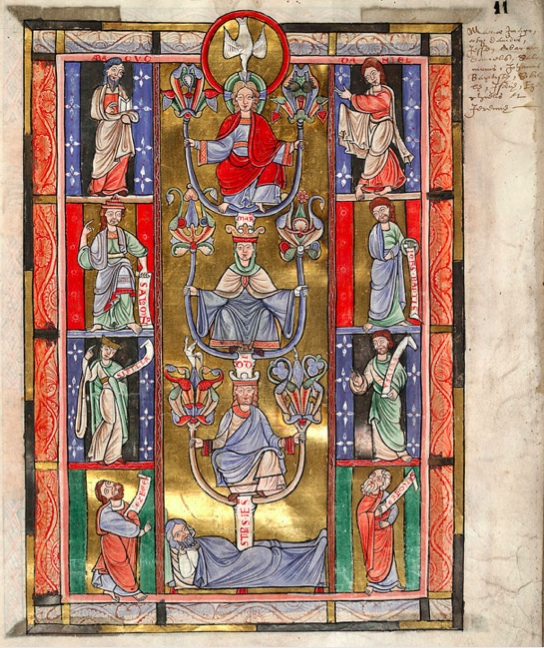
- A page from one of the medieval illuminated manuscripts held by the library (BM Douai Ms. 340)
- Location: 117 Rue de la Fonderie, 59500 Douai, France
- Type: Public library
- Scope: Bibliothèque Municipale Classée
- Established: 1767
- Reference to legal mandate: Code général des collectivités territoriales, art. L 1422-2 & R 1422-2; Code du patrimoine, art. L 310-2

Collection
- Size: about 250,000 works (including 600 medieval manuscripts and 300 incunables)

Other information
- Director: Guillaume Klaes
- Website: http://www.bm-douai.fr

The Bibliothèque municipale de Douai, now known as Bibliothèque Marceline Desbordes-Valmore ( named after the Douai-born poet Marceline Desbordes-Valmore) is a library located in Douai, France. Founded in 1767, it was bombed on August 11, 1944. The library reopened in 1955, in a new building designed by the architect Maurice Coasnes.

The special collections ("réserve patrimoniale") include 607 medieval manuscripts (many of which were confiscated at the suppression of Anchin Abbey and Marchiennes Abbey during the French Revolution), over 300 incunables, a considerable number of works printed in Douai on hand-operated presses from 1569 onwards, and the literary remains (letters and manuscripts) of Marceline Desbordes-Valmore (1786-1859).

== See also ==
- List of libraries in France
