= Bibliothèque du Patrimoine de Clermont Auvergne Métropole =

Coordinates: 45.77°N 3.09°E

Clermont Auvergne Métropole Heritage Library
- Bibliothèque du Patrimoine
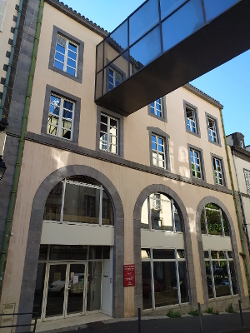
- Main entrance on Rue Bardoux, 2020
- Location: 17 Rue Bardoux, Clermont-Ferrand, France, France
- Type: Research library
- Branch of: Clermont Auvergne Métropole Public Library

Collection
- Items collected: Approximately 170.000

Other information
- Website: www.bibliotheques-clermontmetropole.eu

The Bibliothèque du Patrimoine de Clermont Auvergne Métropole is a public library in Clermont-Ferrand, France. Among the sixteen libraries of Clermont Auvergne Métropole Library System, this library is dedicated to Auvergne. Classified for its old, rare or precious collections, the library is also a regional documentation library which works in conjunction with the Bibliothèque nationale de France to ensure the collection by legal deposit and the conservation of books and periodicals printed in Auvergne.

== History ==
During the French revolution confiscations were made from the religious communities and from emigrants living in the region. First opened to the public in 1793, the municipal library was moved to the hôpital des frères de la Charité in 1800 and joined a new building to be part of the Bibliothèque municipale et universitaire in 1905. In 1994, the Heritage and Local History Library moves into a new building, rue Bardoux. It will be moved in 2027 in the listed 18th century Hôtel-Dieu hospital building to create a new 11000m2 Clermont Auvergne Metropolitan Library with an outdoor reading garden.

== Collections ==
This Heritage and Local History Library houses about 170,000 volumes : more than 3,700 linear meters of manuscripts, books, periodicals, but also engravings, maps and plans, photographs, and more.

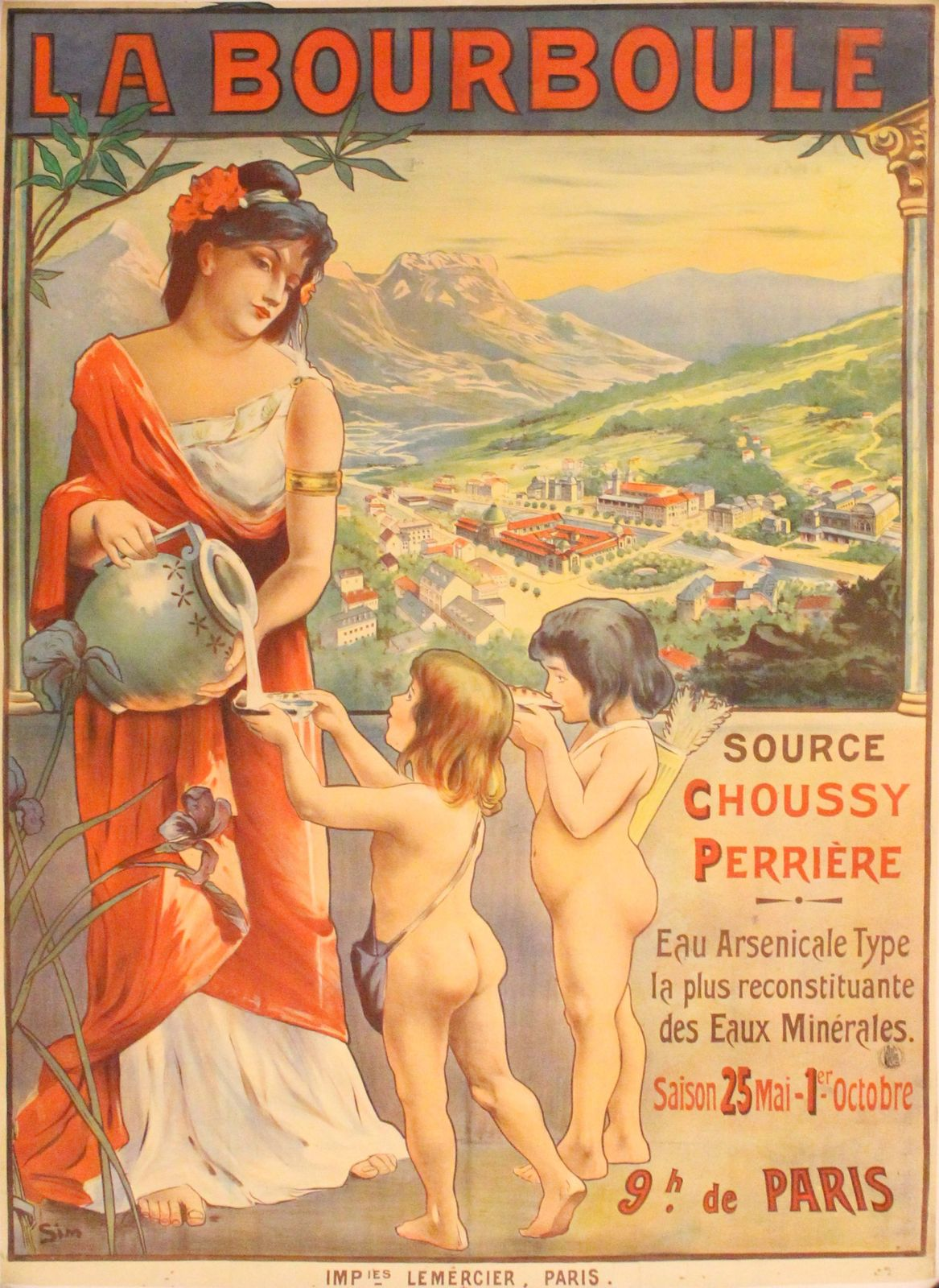
La Bourboule, Spa resort

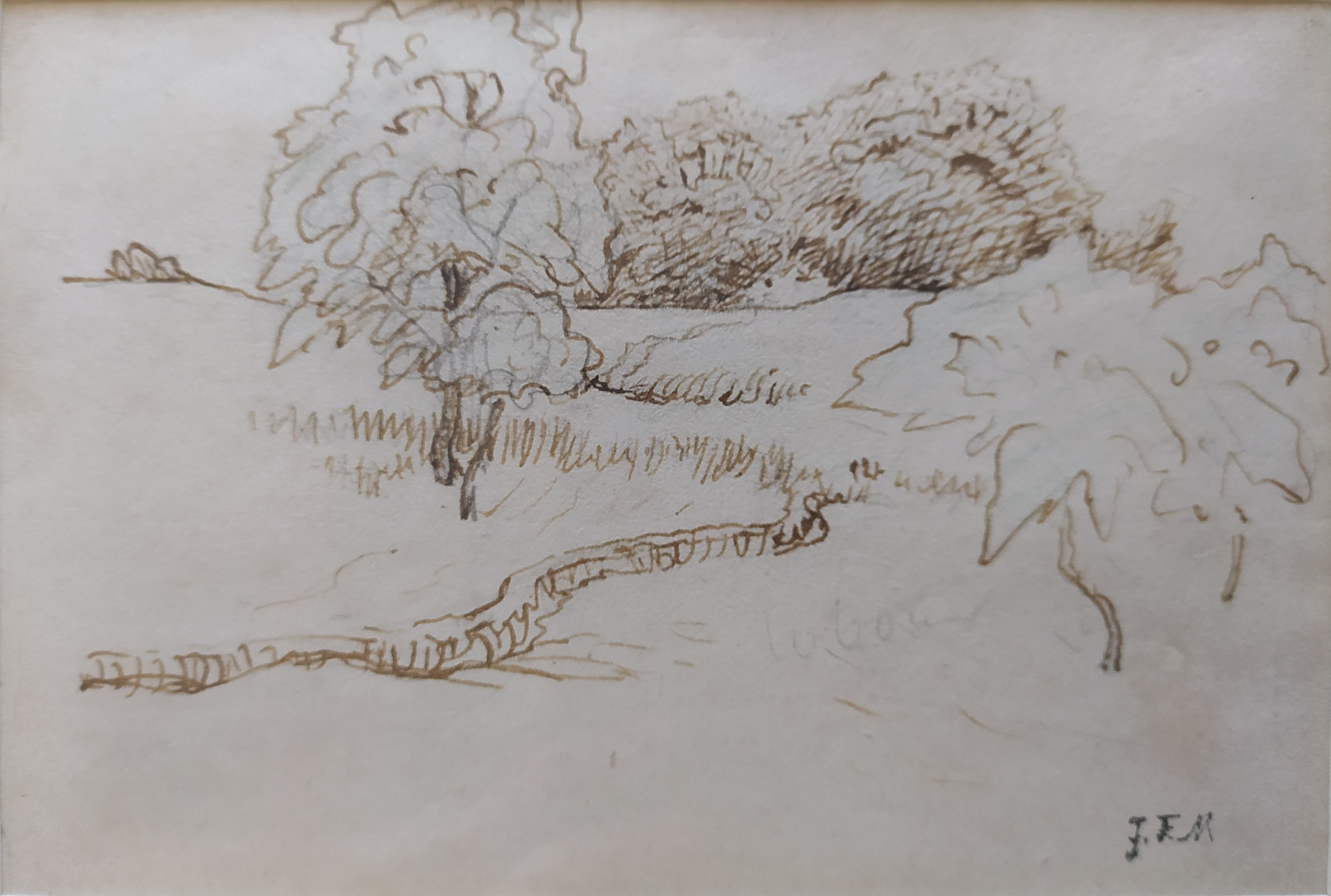
Drawing by Jean-François Millet

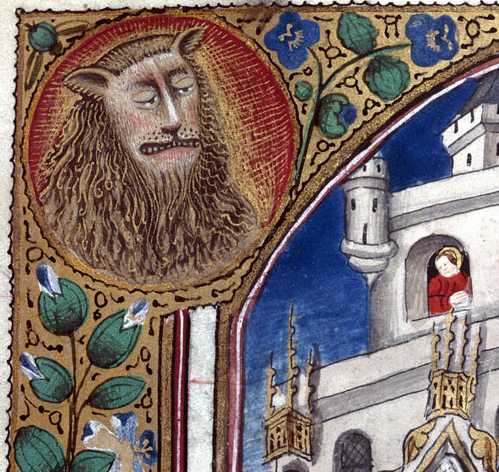
Book of Hours (circa 1460)

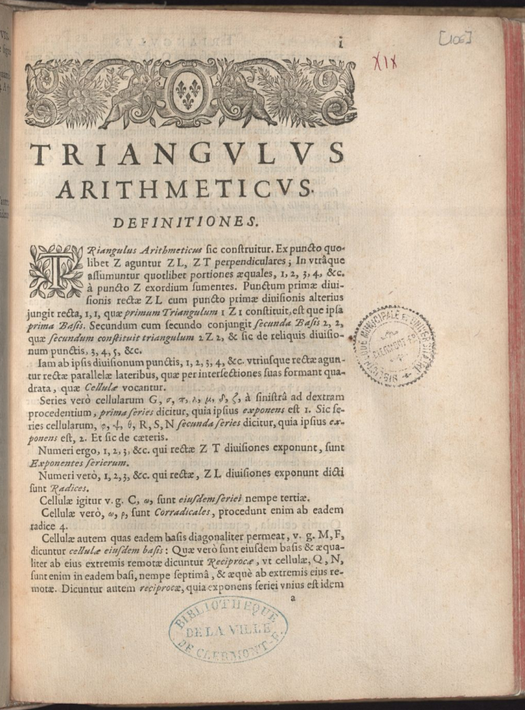
Blaise Pascal collection

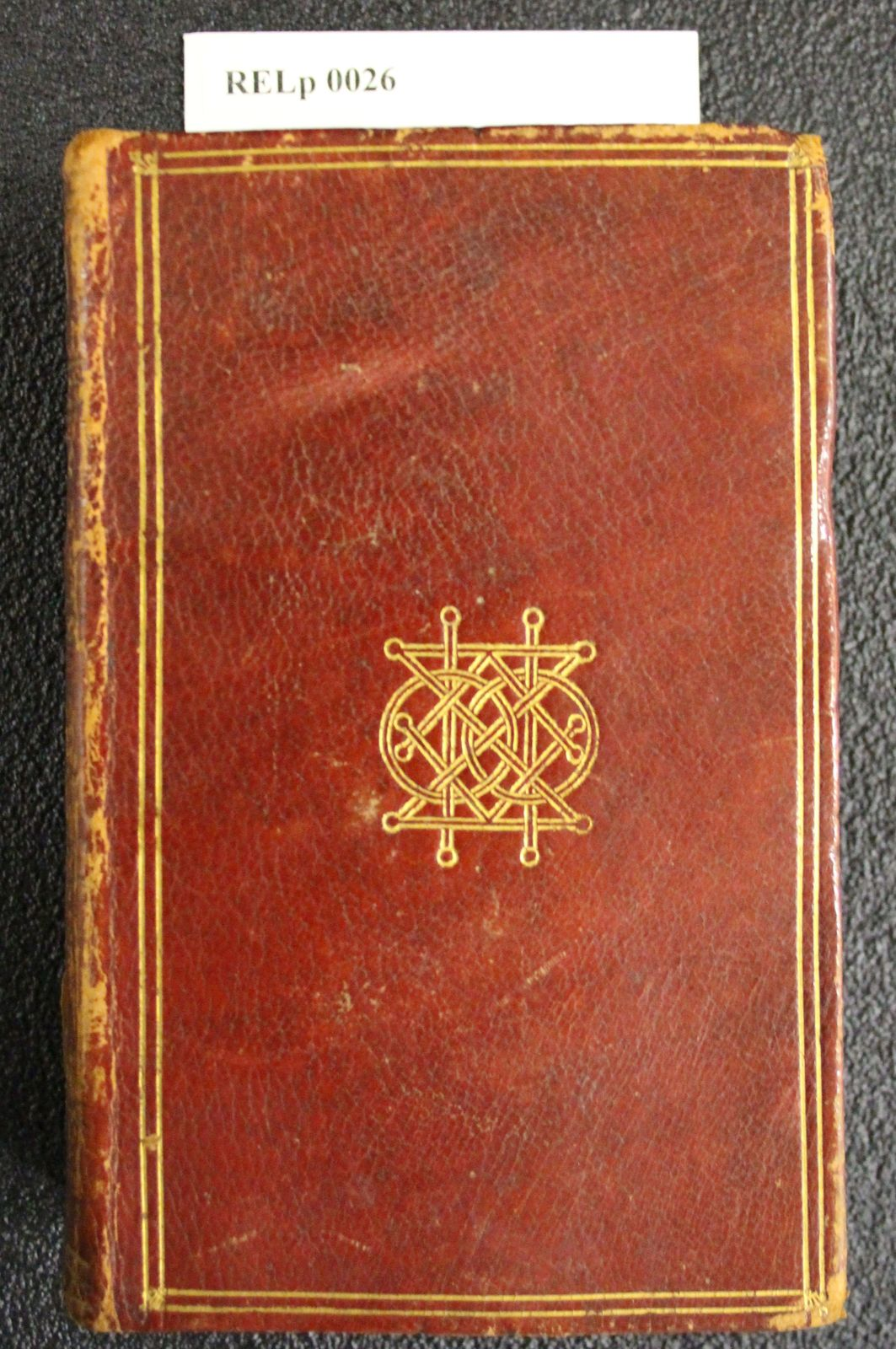
Peiresc’s Greek cipher

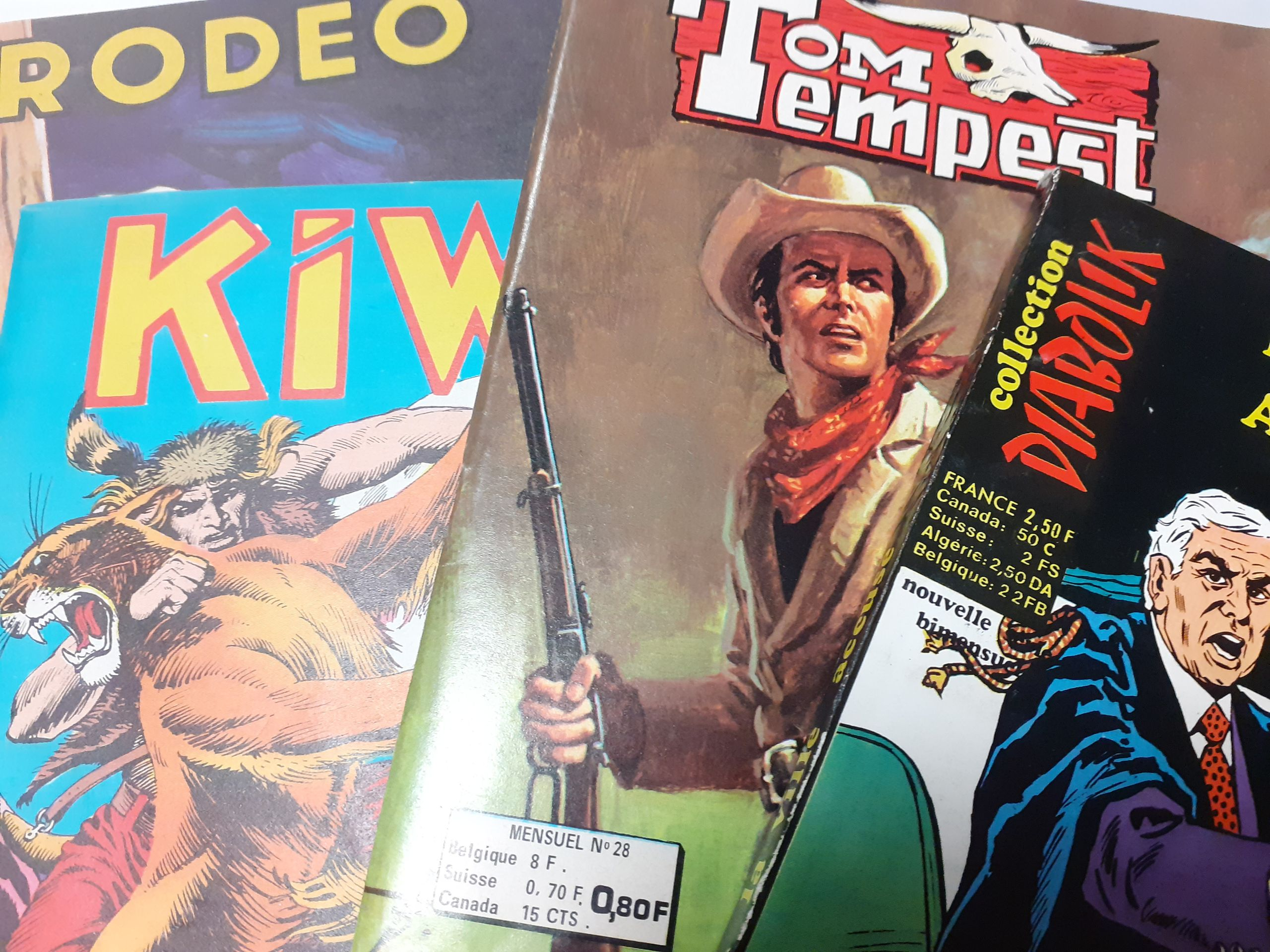
Legal deposit

== Access and services ==
The Library is located at 17 rue Bardoux. It is currently closed and will move into Clermont-Ferrand Metropolitan Library to reopen in 2027. A digital library, called "Overnia", provides online access to digitized collections.

== See also ==
- List of libraries in France

== Bibliography ==
- Frasson-Cochet (1995). Patrimoine des bibliothèques de France : Auvergne, Bourgogne, Rhône-Alpes. Payot.
- Stanton Williams (2026). "Clermont-Ferrand Metropolitan Library".
- Niall Patrick Walsh (July 4, 2019). "Stanton Williams Inserts "Jewel Box" Library into Historic French Hospital".
