= Pierre Patout =

French architect and interior designer

Pierre Patout (1879–1965) was a French architect and interior designer, who was one of the major figures of the Art Deco movement, as well as a pioneer of Streamline Moderne design. His works included the design of the main entrance and the Pavilion d'un Collecteur at the International Exhibition of Modern Decorative and Industrial Arts in Paris in 1925, and the interiors of the ocean liner Normandie and other French transatlantic liners in the 1930s.

== Life ==
Pierre Patout was born on 23 April 1879 in Tonnerre in the Yonne Department. He died on 21 May 1965 in Yonne in Souzay-Champigny, in the Maine-et-Loire Department. During the First World War, he was a member of the camouflage department of the French Army, under the command of the painter Lucien-Victor Guirand de Scévolaor, along with a number of other French artists.

=== 1925 Exposition of Decorative Arts ===
Following the war, he worked closely with his friend the decorator Emile-Jacques Ruhlmann. The two collaborated particularly on designs for the International Exhibition of Modern Decorative and Industrial Arts in Paris from April to October 1925, the event that introduced the style and gave it its name. There were 15,000 exhibitors from twenty countries, It was visited by sixteen million people during its seven-month run. The main purpose of the Exhibit was to promote the French manufacturers of luxury furniture, porcelain, glass, metal work, textiles and other decorative products. All the major Paris department stores and major designers had their own pavilions.

Patout designed the main gateway of the Exposition on the Place de la Concorde, and also The Hôtel du Riche Collectionneur, one of the most popular attractions at the Exposition. Inside it displayed it new furniture designs of Emile-Jacques Ruhlmann, as well as Art Deco fabrics, carpets, and a painting by Jean Dupas. The interior design followed the same principles of symmetry and geometric forms which set it apart from Art Nouveau, and bright colors, fine craftsmanship rare and expensive materials which set it apart from the strict functionality of the Modernist style.

=== The Style Paquebot ===
His success at the 1925 Exposition led to a commission to design the interior of the newest French transatlantic ocean liner, the Île-de-France in 1926, done entirely in the Art Deco style. This was followed by further commissions for the L'Atlantique (1930), and, the most famous of all the Normandie (1935). The highlight of the Normandie interior was the dining room, illuminated with rows of lighted columns of Lalique crystal.

This style was known in France as Pacquebot, or ocean liner, and it had an important influence on the later Streamline Moderne style of Art Deco. It was so popular that Patout applied to it several buildings in Paris; a building on rue Docteur Blanche (1929); another on rue Félicien-David; and a building on Boulevard Victor, on a narrow tapering lot, which he built to resemble a ship, with a pointed bow, long narrow terrace with railings resembling decks, and structures on the roof resembling smokestacks. He also built the Hotel Mércédes on Avenue de Wagram.

=== World's Fairs and Postwar work ===
He continued to create exposition architecture. He designed the pavilion of Artists and Decorators for the Paris International Exposition of 1937, and with fellow architect Roger-Henri Expert co-designed the strikingly modern, oval, glass-and-concrete Pavilion of France for the 1939 New York World's Fair.

Following World War II, he took part in the reconstruction of the city of Tours, badly damaged in the fighting. He was the architect of among other buildings in Tours, for example the new city public library.

== Works ==
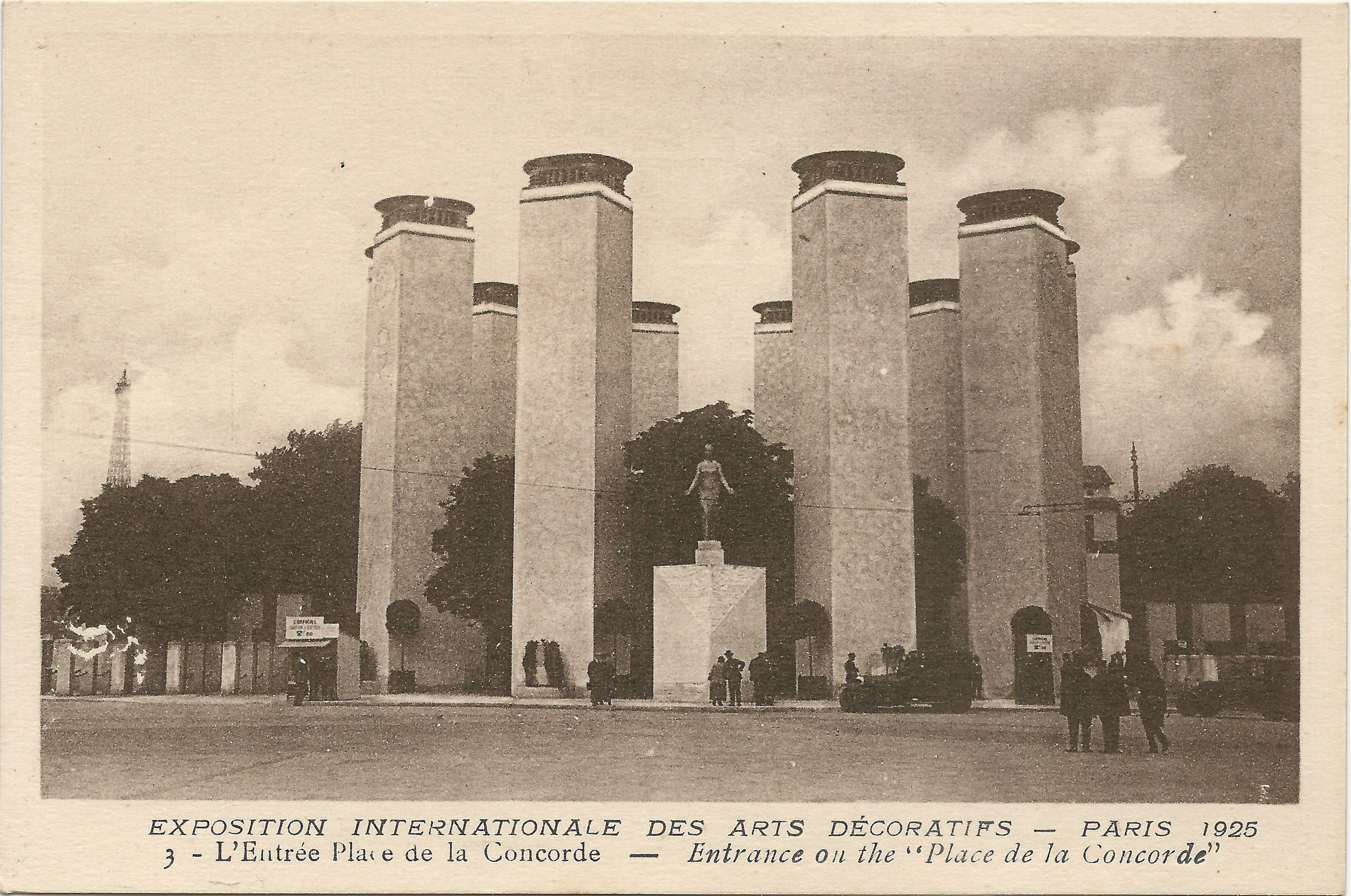
Concorde Entrance to the 1925 Paris Exposition of Decorative Arts (1925)

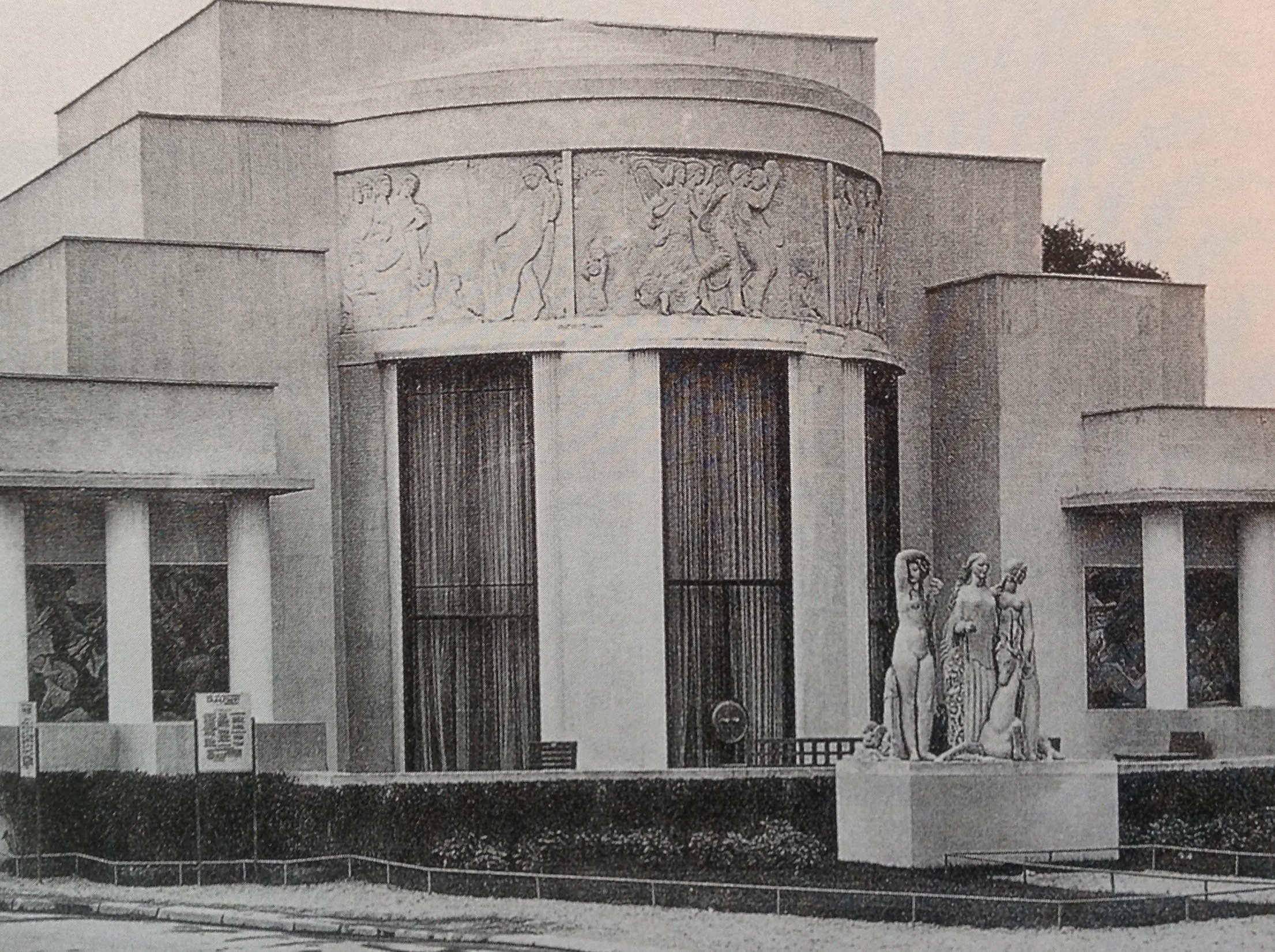
Pavilion of a Collector, Paris Exposition of Decorative Arts (1925)

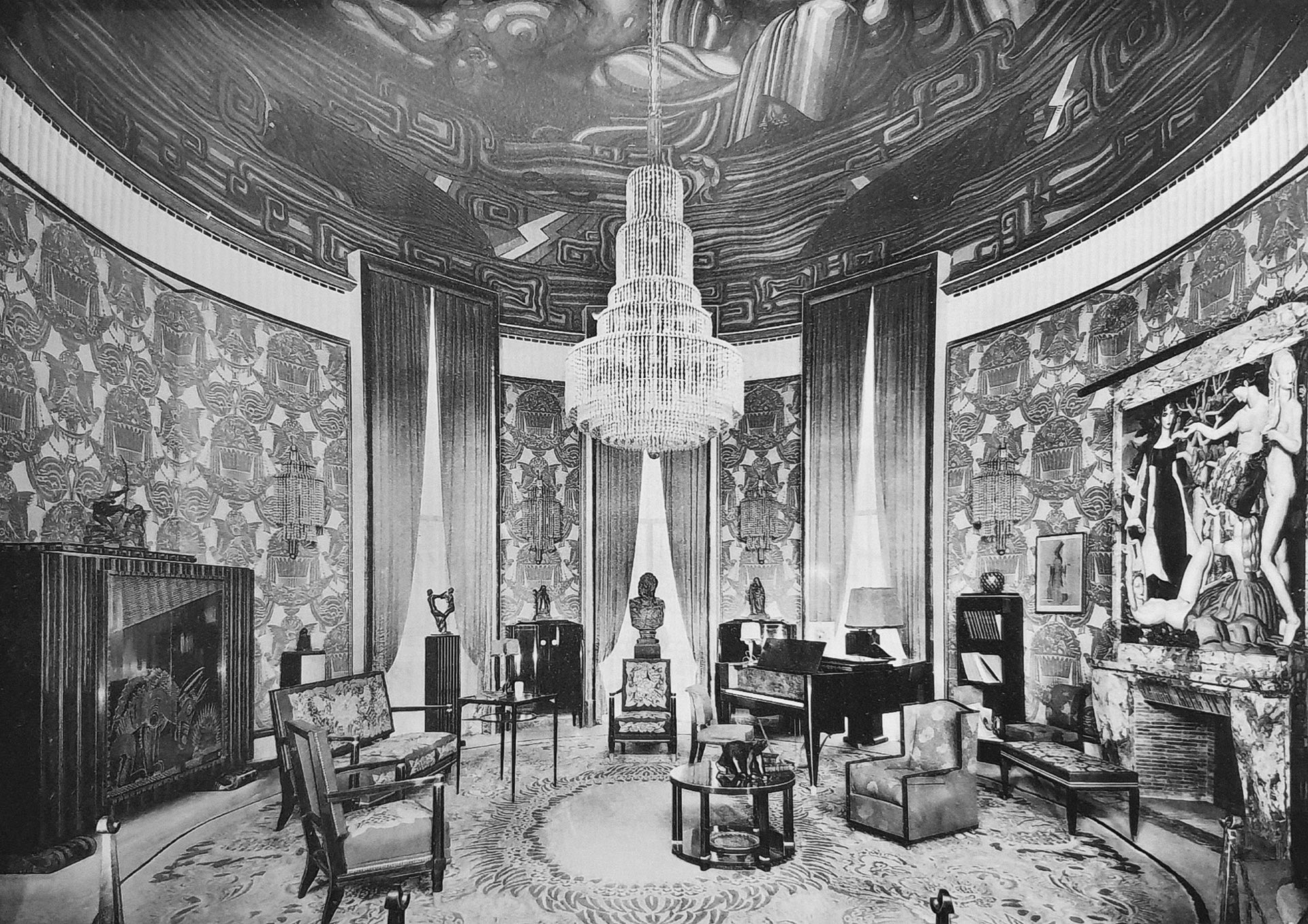
Salon of a Collector, Paris Exposition of Decorative Arts (1925)

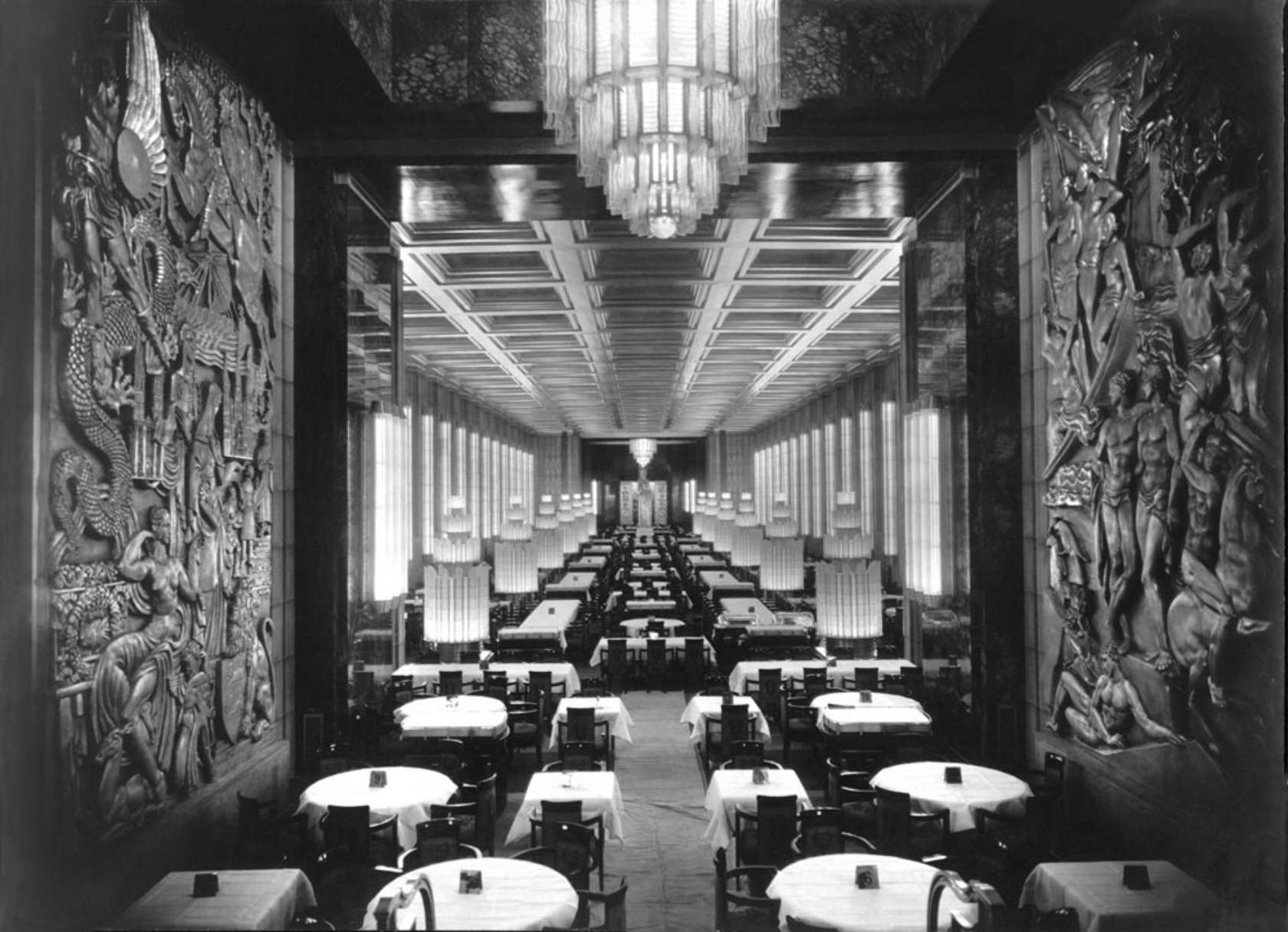
Main dining room of the ocean liner S.S. Normandie by Pierre Patout (1935)

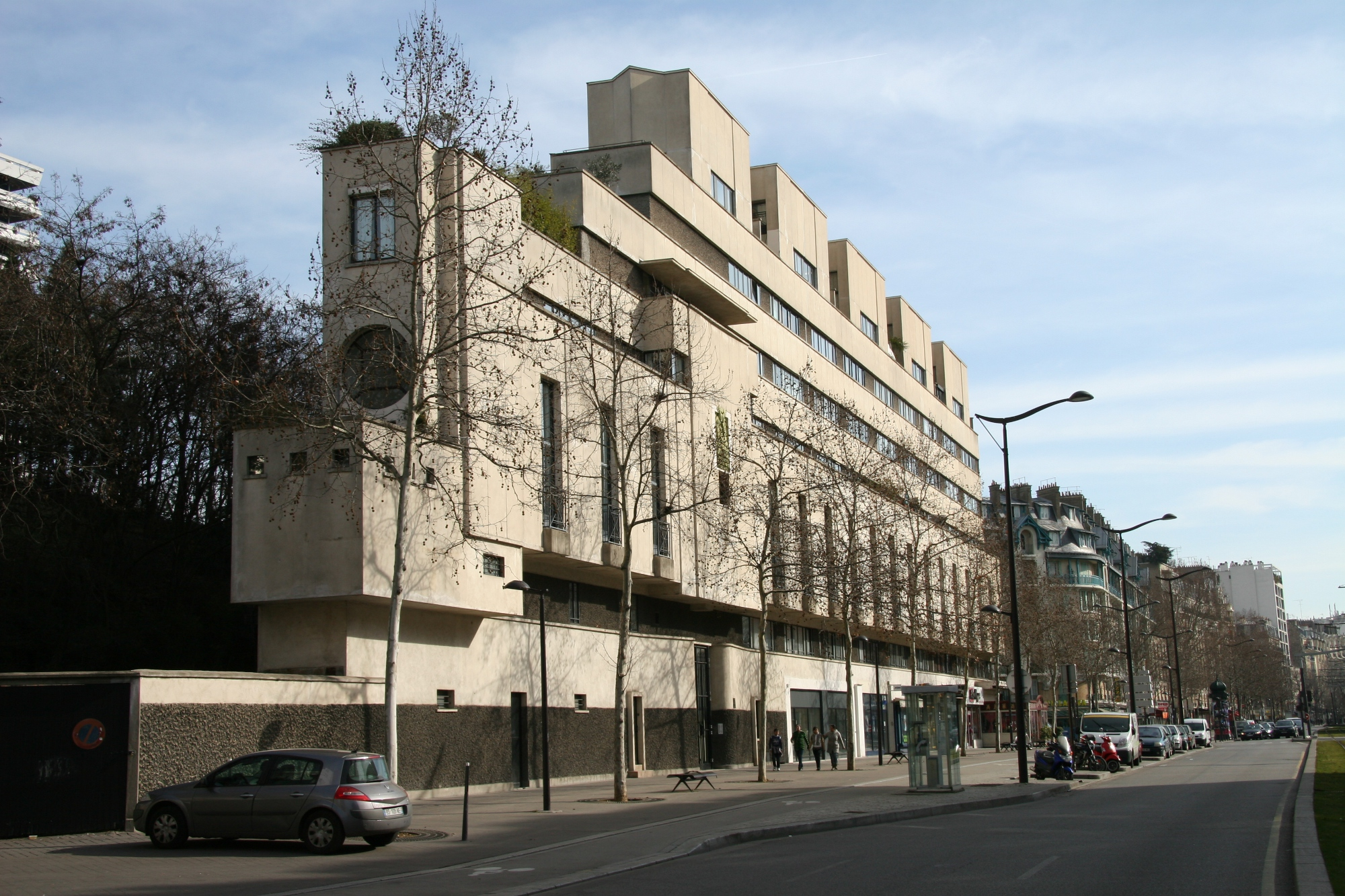
Paquebot building at 3 Boulevard Victor, 15th arrondissement, Paris by Pierre Patout (1935)

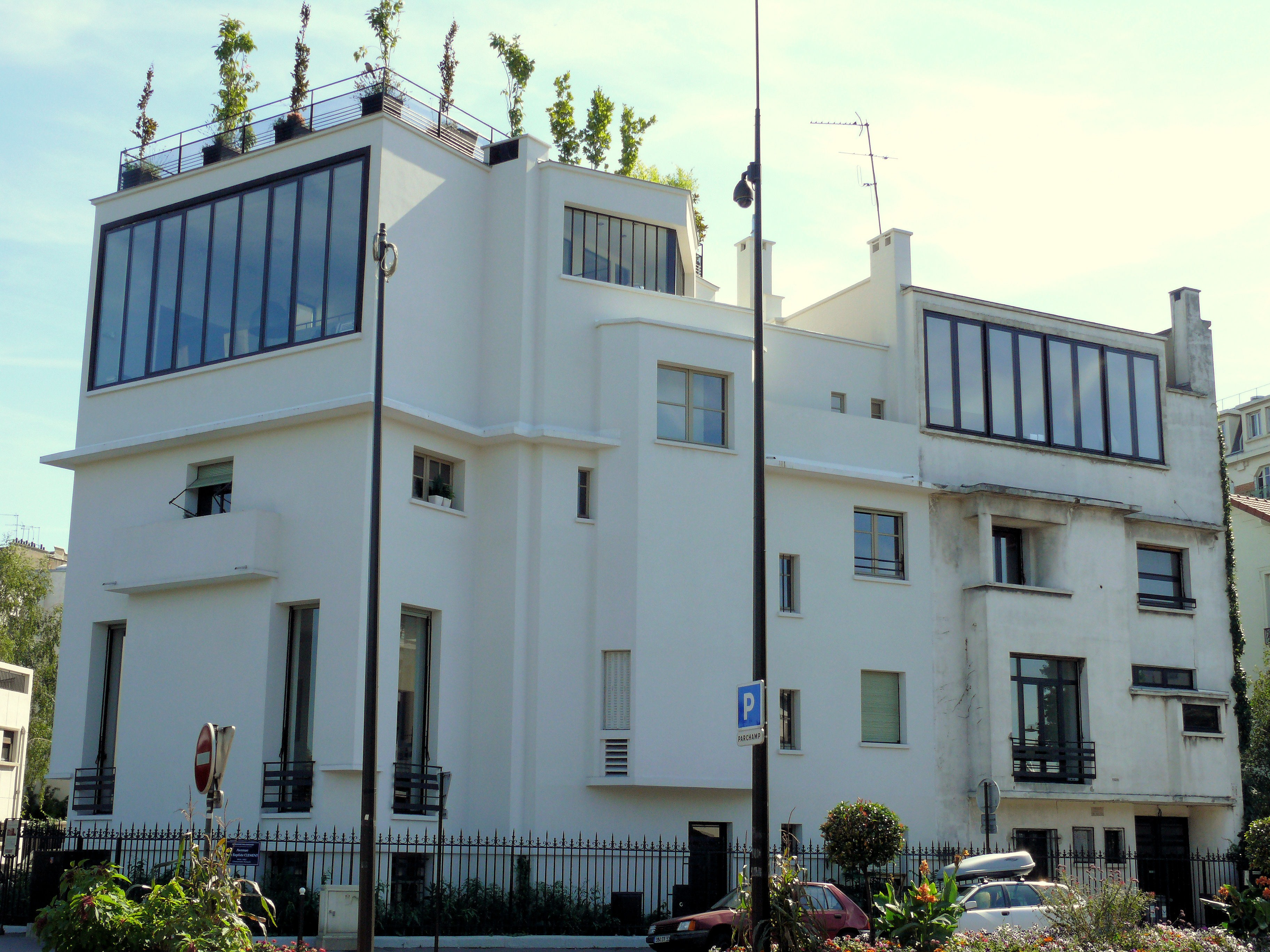
Residence and workshop of Patout, 2 rue Gambetta, Boulogne-Billancourt

== See also ==
- Art Deco in Paris

== Bibliography ==
- Arwas, Victor (1992). Art Deco. Harry N. Abrams. ISBN 0-8109-1926-5.
- Charles, Victoria (2013). Art Déco. Parkstone International. ISBN 978-1-84484-864-5.
- Duncan, Alastair (1988). Art déco. Thames & Hudson. ISBN 2-87811-003-X.
- Oudin, Bernard (1994). Dictionaire des Architectes. Seghiers. ISBN 2-232-10398-6.
