= Bibliothèque municipale de Besançon =

Municipal library in Besançon, France

Besançon Municipal Library
- Bibliothèque municipale de Besançon
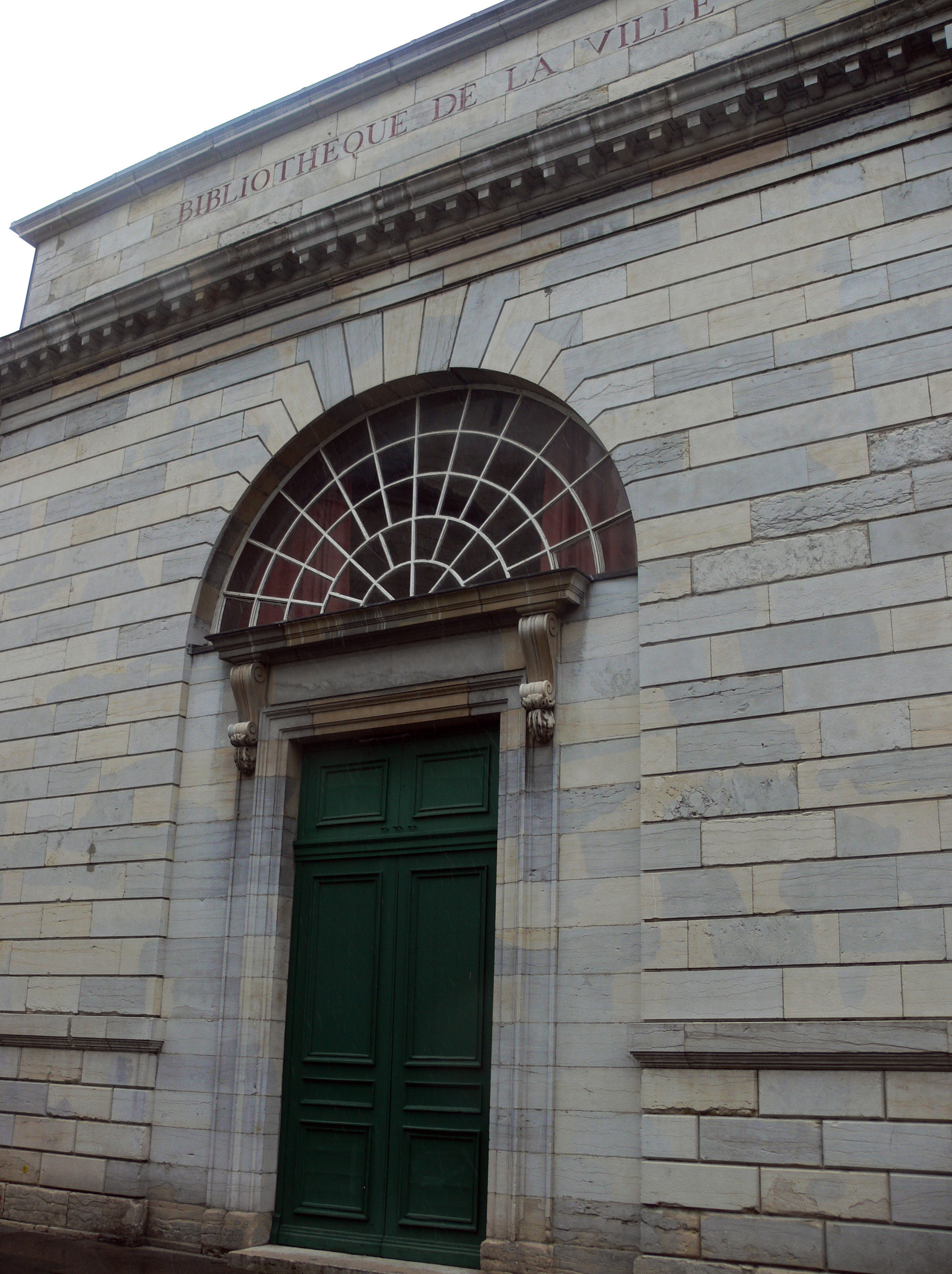
- Besançon Municipal Library
- 47°14′10″N 6°01′39″E
- Location: Besançon, France
- Established: 1694

Bibliothèque municipale de Besançon or Besançon municipal library is located in Eastern France. It is the first public library that was built in Besançon.

== History ==
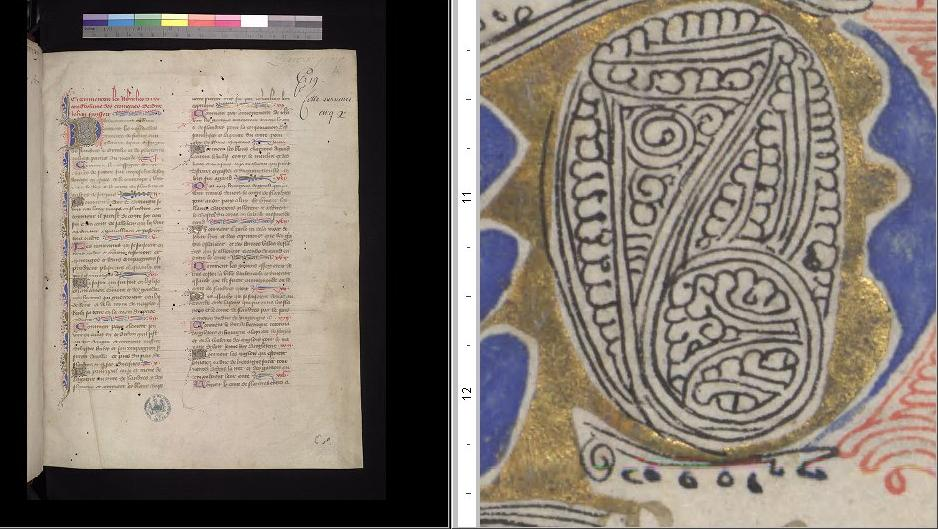
Two different views of the same folios from Besançon MS 865

The library was founded in 1694, when the Benedictine Abbot Jean-Baptiste Boisot (1638–1694) bequeathed his personal collections to the Abbey Saint Vincent in Besançon, under the sole condition that it would be publicly available. The collection of Boisot is exceptionally rich with manuscripts that date back to the 7th and 15th centuries.

A large part of the collection came from Nicolas Perrenot de Granvelle and his son Antoine. In 1808, a building was established for the library on the plans of Franche-Comté architect Denis Lapret. During the French revolution confiscations were made from the religious communities and from emigrants living in the region. These were appropriated for the library.

The building was finished in 1817, and officially opened on April 27, 1818. The building was extended several times up to 1839 when it took its current form, which is composed of four blocks around a central courtyard.

The Ministry of Culture and Communication digitized the 167 illuminated manuscripts of the library. The library of Besançon holds more than 500,000 handwritten documents, drawings, prints, medals, stamps, and coins which make it one of the richest libraries in France.

== Collection ==
The library contains about 1,000 incunabula and 2,800 mediaeval manuscripts. The most ancient of the manuscripts date from the 7th century, though most are from the 15th century.

Several liturgical manuscripts are beautifully illuminated, especially the Psalter of Bonmont (13th century) or manuscripts illuminated for the archbishops of Besançon and Charles de Neuchâtel.

The 14th-century manuscript "The Day of Judgement", catalogued as Ms. 579, contains 89 miniatures depicting the action of the play and three neumed musical pieces.

Besançon BM 434 contains textbooks for Charles V: book of educations of the princes, 49 miniatures, made by several artists having worked on the copy of Travels of Jean de Mandeville.

== See also ==
- Manuscript housed at the Bibliothèque municipale de Besançon in Besançon
- List of libraries in France
