= Jean Dupas =

French painter (1882–1964)

Jean Théodore Dupas
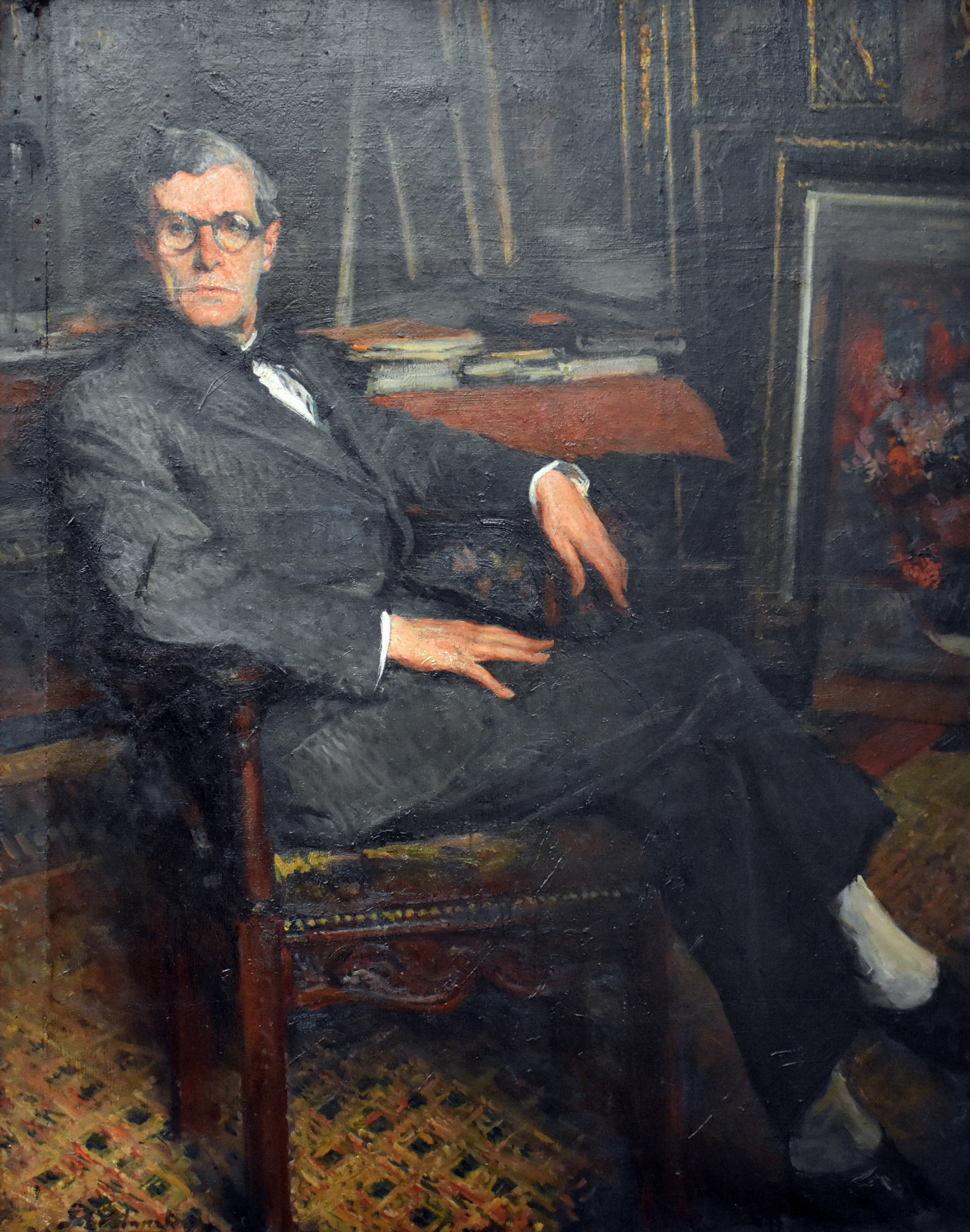
- Portrait by Jacques-Émile Blanche, c. 1920
- Born: 21 February 1882; Bordeaux, France
- Died: 6 September 1964 (aged 82)
- Known for: Painting, design, decoration, poster art
- Movement: Art Nouveau, Art Deco
- Awards: Prix de Rome (1910); Gold medal, Salon des Artistes Français

Jean Théodore Dupas (21 February 1882 – 6 September 1964) was a French painter, artist, designer, poster artist, and decorator in the Art Nouveau and Art Deco styles.

== Early life and education ==
Dupas was born in Bordeaux. In 1910, he won the Prix de Rome. He continued to paint in Italy for two years, completing "Le Danse", the predecessor for his painting "Les Pigeons Blanc" (The White Pigeons), which was awarded the gold medal when presented at the Salon des Artistes Français.

== Career and style ==
=== 1925 Paris exhibition ===
In 1925, Dupas' work came to define the Art Deco movement and the school of Bordeaux. That year he participated at the Exposition Internationale des Arts Décoratifs et Industriels Modernes in Paris, where he exhibited "Les Perruches" (also known as The Parrots or The Parakeets). The painting became one of the most recognizable works of the Art Deco movement, which flourished between the two world wars and culminated at the New York World's Fair in 1939.

=== Commercial and fashion work ===
The Dupas style dominated advertisement and commercial art for the entire period. He produced a great quantity of advertising works that appeared in fashion magazines like Vogue and Harper's Bazaar. In 1927, with the aide of French printing house Draeger, he created a catalogue for the fur company Max, considered a "masterpiece of press advertisement".

In the 1930s, Dupas was commissioned by Frank Pick to produce artwork for a series of posters for the underground network of London Transport.

=== Ocean liner commissions ===
Dupas expressed his predilection for large-scale projects: "The bigger my work, the happier I am." He collaborated on the decor of famous steamships during the 1930s, emphasizing the Art Deco mode of the time. Among these works were commissions for the SS Île-de-France and the SS Liberté.

In 1934, Dupas created glass panels for the corners of the Normandie's first-class Grand Salon, representing the history of navigation. He used a technique known as verre églomisé, in which portions of the pictorial scene were painted in black and various pastel colors on the reverse of plate-glass panels. Charles Champigneulle fabricated the panels. Just over twenty feet in height, his part of this mural is now exhibited at the Metropolitan Museum of Art. In 1935, with the help of glass master Champigneulle, he decorated the grand salon of the Normandie in more than 400 square metres of painted and frosted glass.

=== Later career ===
He became a member of the Académie des Beaux-Arts in 1941.

== Works ==
- Frescos of the Saint-Esprit church, Paris
- Frescos of the d'Albert dans la Somme church
- Palais royal de Bucarest
- Collège Saint Louis, Paris
- Frescos of the Claude Monet school, Paris
- Great frescos of the La vigne et le vin, in the Aquitaine museum, Bordeaux
- Two frescos in the viewing room at the Bordeaux Stock Market Exchange
- La femme en rouge (1927), Musée des arts décoratifs, Paris
- La fontaine italienne (1926), Musée de Beauvais
- Le char de l'aurore. This last panel constitute of Normandie which was exposed at the Metropolitan Museum of Art in the 2005 exhibition, Art Deco Paris. Today is housed at the Carnegie Museum of Art, Pittsburgh.
- Musée Antoine-Lécuyer, Saint Quentin
- Musée des arts décoratifs, Bordeaux

== Sources ==
- du Pasquier, Jacqueline (1997). Bordeaux Art Déco (in French). Éditions Somogy.
- Affiches de Jean Dupas. Catalogue de l'exposition (in French). Bordeaux. 1987.
- Les Pages d'or de l'édition française (in French). Mairie de Paris. 1988.
- Bayer, Patricia (1988). Art déco. Le livre (in French). Éditions Florilège.
- Vian, Louis René (1992). Les Arts décoratifs à bord des paquebots français (in French). Éditions Fonmare.
