= International Exhibition of Modern Decorative and Industrial Arts =

Specialized exhibition held in Paris, France, in 1925

Coordinates: 48.8636°N 2.3136°E

1925 Paris
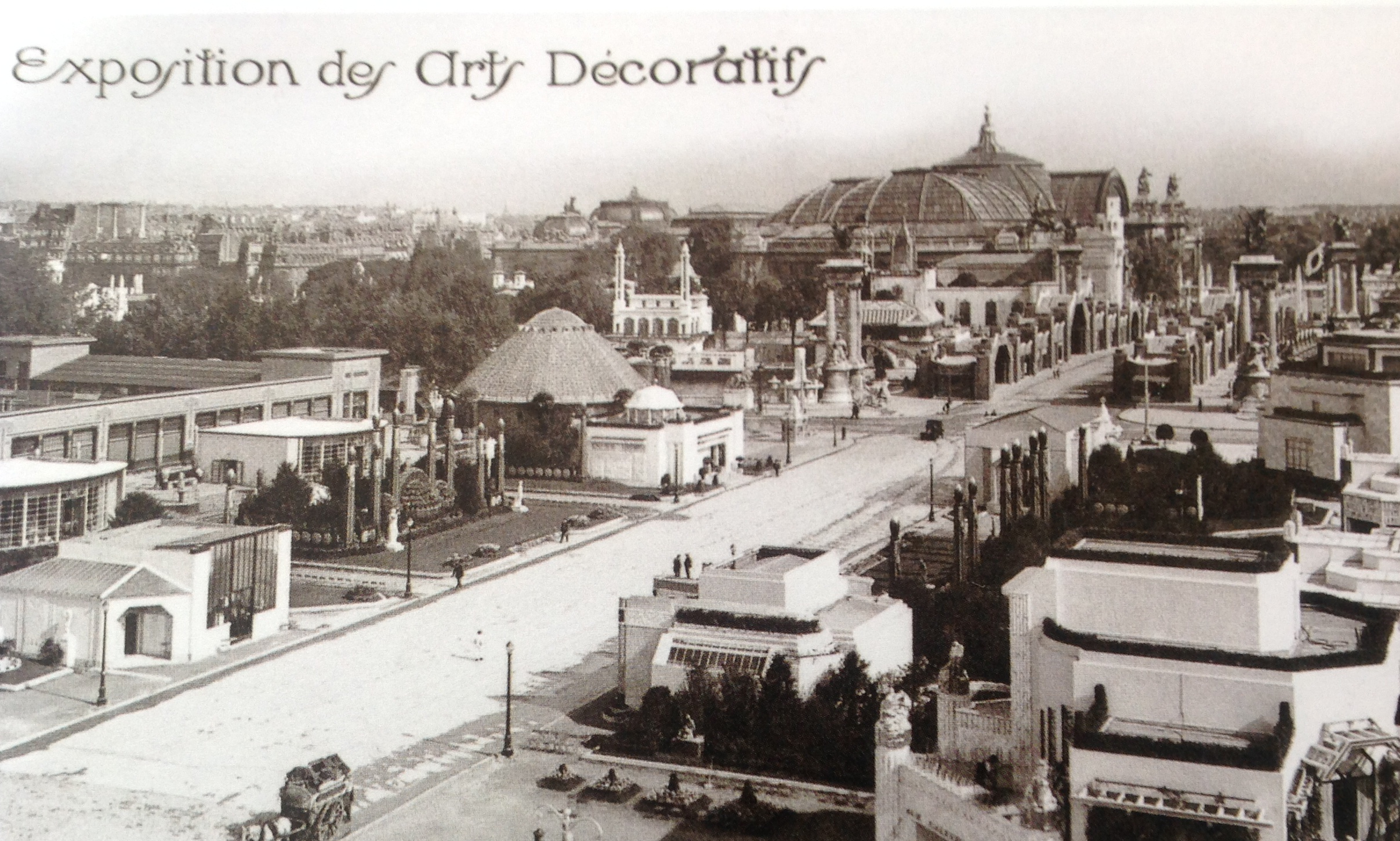
- Postcard of the Exposition Internationale des Arts décoratifs et industriels modernes (1925)

Overview
- BIE-class: Specialized exposition
- Category: International specialized exposition
- Name: Exposition internationale des arts décoratifs et industriels modernes
- Visitors: Over 16 Million in 6 months

Location
- Country: France
- City: Paris

Timeline
- Opening: April 28, 1925
- Closure: November 8, 1925

The International Exhibition of Modern Decorative and Industrial Arts (French: Exposition internationale des arts décoratifs et industriels modernes) was a specialized exhibition held in Paris, France, from April 29 (the day after it was inaugurated in a private ceremony by the President of France) to November 8, 1925 (Originally the event was scheduled to end on October 25, but since it was visited by over 16 million people by the end of October, it was extended for two more weeks). It was designed by the French government to highlight the new modern style of architecture, interior decoration, furniture, glass, jewelry and other decorative arts in Europe and throughout the world. Many ideas of the international avant-garde in the fields of architecture and applied arts were presented for the first time at the exposition. The event took place between the esplanade of Les Invalides and the entrances of the Grand Palais and Petit Palais, and on both banks of the Seine. There were 15,000 exhibitors from twenty countries, and it was visited by over sixteen million people during its six-month run. The modern style presented at the exposition later became known as "Art Deco", after the exposition's name.

== The idea and the organization ==
The idea for an exhibition entirely devoted to the decorative arts originally came from the Société des Artistes Décorateurs (The Society of Decorative Artists), a group founded in 1901 which included both established artists, including Eugène Grasset and Hector Guimard, as well as younger artists including Francis Jourdain, Maurice Dufrêne, Paul Follot and Pierre Chareau. Decorative artists had been allowed to participate in the previous two Paris Salons, but they were placed subordinate to the painters, and they wanted an exhibit which gave first place to decorative arts. The first Salons of the new group were held in the newly opened Museum of Decorative Arts in the Pavillon de Marsan of the Louvre. The Salon d'Automne, a new Salon founded in 1903, honored painters, sculptors, graphics artists and architects, but again decorative arts were largely ignored. Frantz Jourdain announced the idea of holding a separate exhibit of decorative arts as soon as possible. He explained his reason in an essay written later, in 1928: "We consequently resolved to return Decorative Art, inconsiderately treated as a Cinderella or poor relation allowed to eat with the servants, to the important, almost preponderant place it occupied in the past, of all times and in all of the countries of the globe."

The Society of Decorative Artists lobbied the French Chamber of Deputies, which in 1912 agreed to host an international exhibition of decorative arts in 1915. The plans were put aside in 1915 because of the First World War, then revived after the war ended in 1918. It was first scheduled for 1922, then postponed because of a shortage of construction materials to 1924 and then 1925, twenty-five years after the 1900 Universal Exposition.

The program for the exhibition made it clear that it was intended to be a celebration of modernism, not of historical styles. It was declared to be "open to all manufacturers whose products are artistic in character and show clearly modern tendencies." The program also stated specifically that "Whatever the reputation of the artist, whatever the commercial strength of the manufacturer, neither will be allowed into the exhibition if they do not fit the conditions outlined in the exhibition program." A second purpose was attached to the exhibition: to honor the Allied countries in the First World War. For this reason the new Soviet Union was invited, though its government was not yet recognized by France, while Germany was not. The United States declined to participate; the U.S. Secretary of Commerce, Herbert Hoover, explained that there was no modern art in the United States. The U.S. Commerce Department did appoint a commission to attend the exhibit and issue a report. The report, which came out in 1926, stated that the U.S had clearly misunderstood the purpose of the exposition, and that at least some participation should have been arranged to honor the French-American wartime alliance. While the U.S. did not have a pavilion, hundreds of American designers, artists, journalists and department store buyers came to Paris to see the exposition.

== The site ==
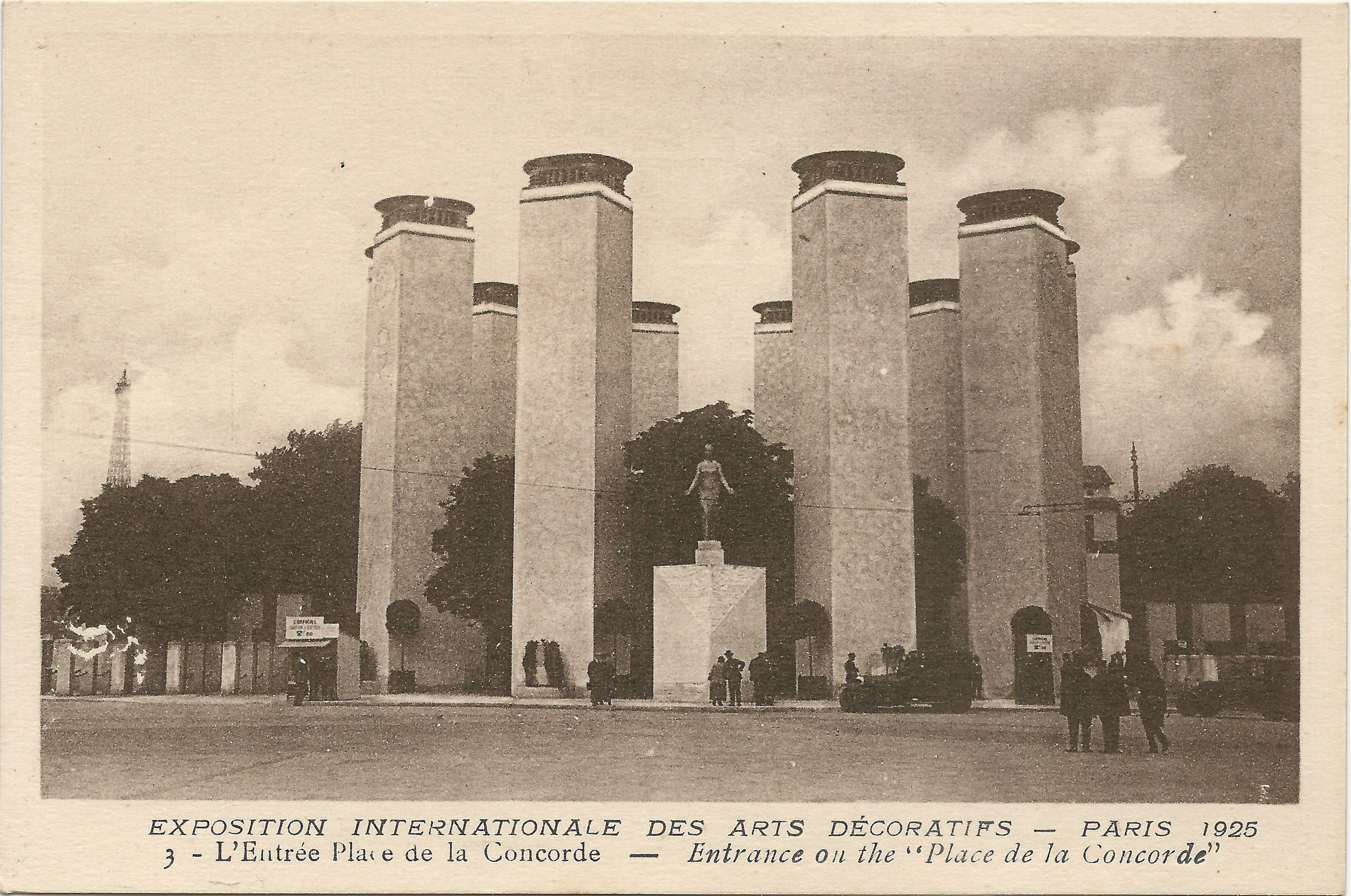
The main entrance to the exhibition on the Place de la Concorde, designed by Pierre Patout, with a statue in the center by Louis Dejean

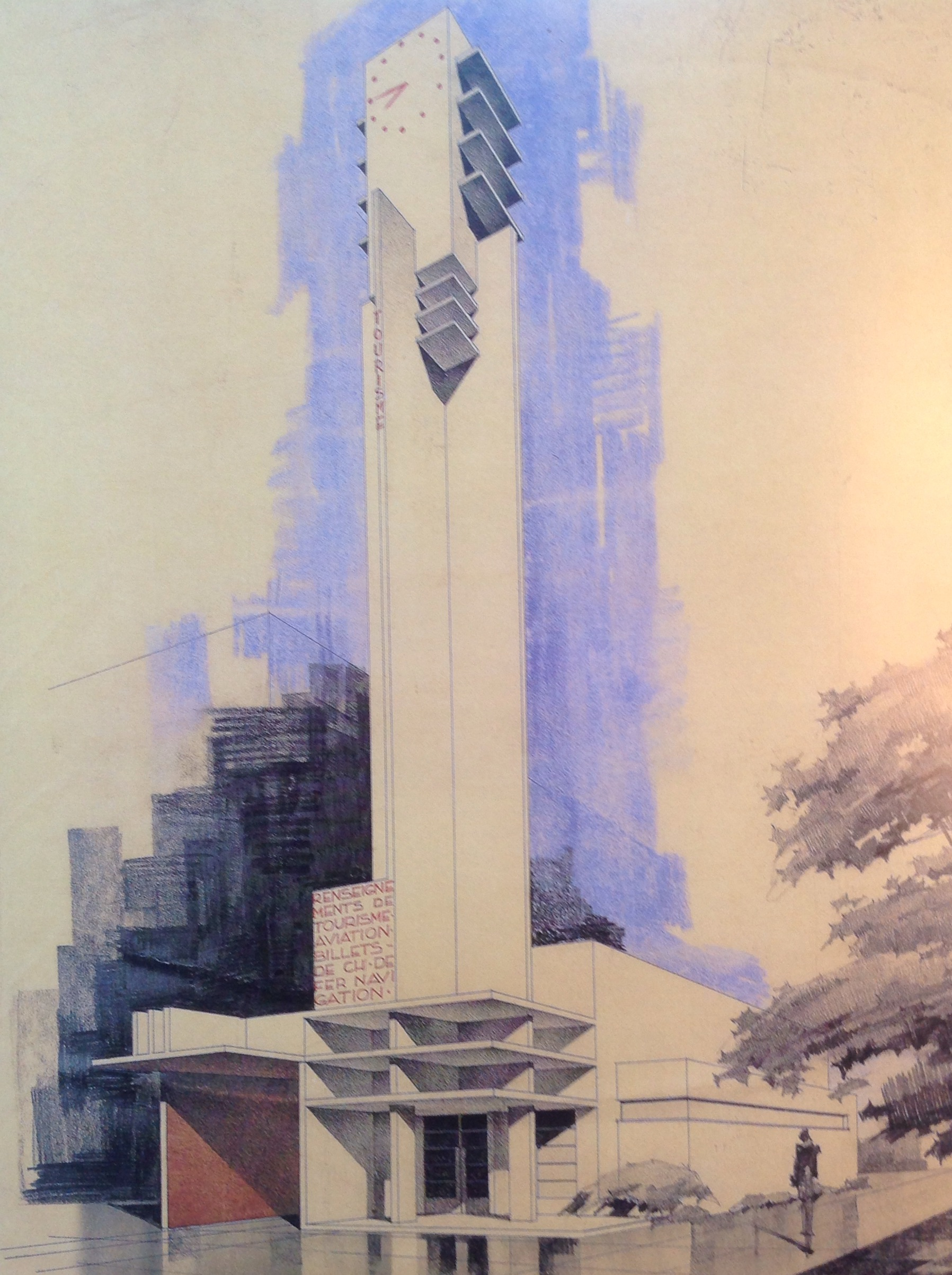
The Tourism Pavilion by Robert Mallet-Stevens

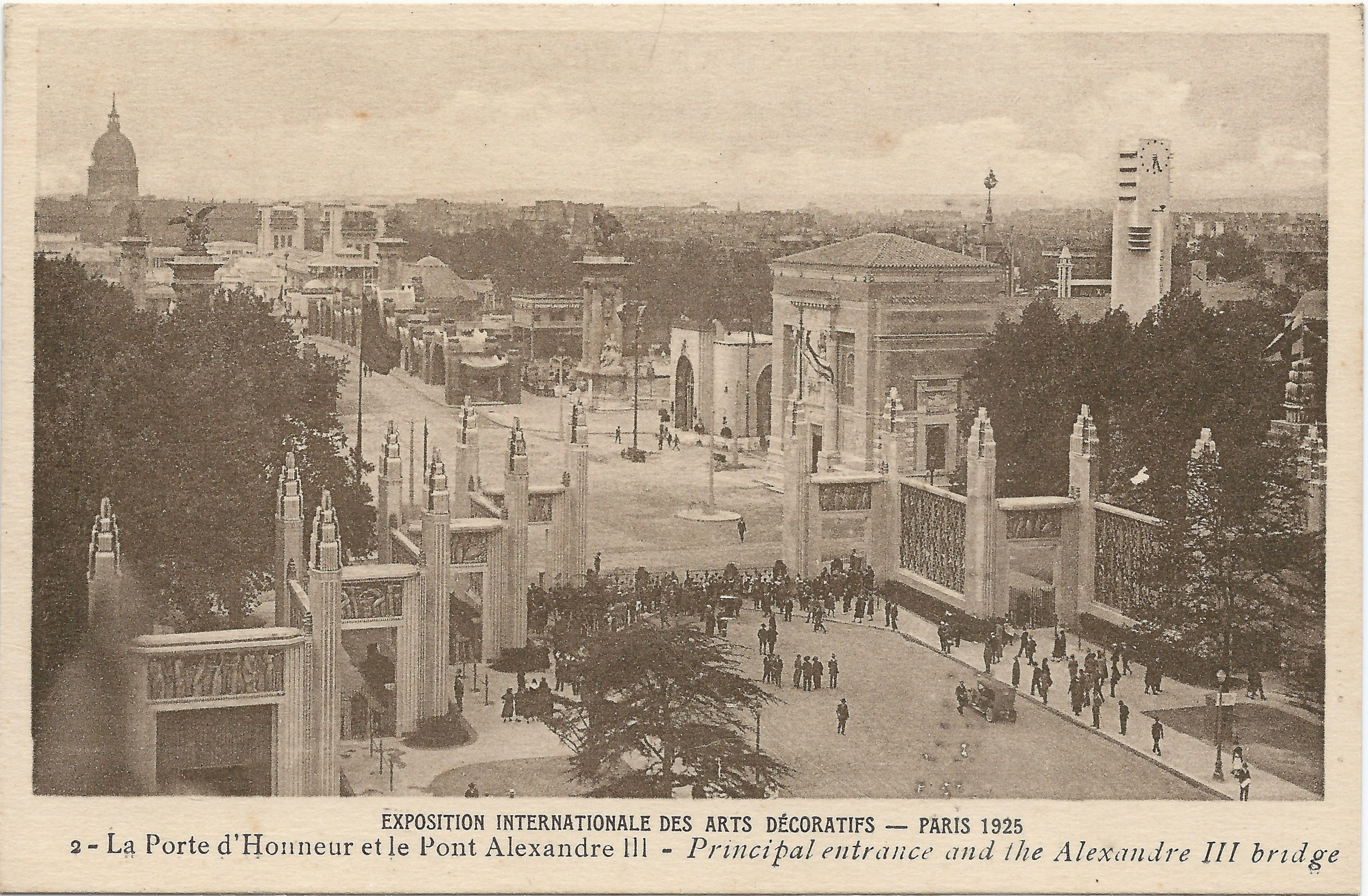
The main axis of the exposition, from the Gateway of Honor across the Pont Alexandre III to Les Invalides

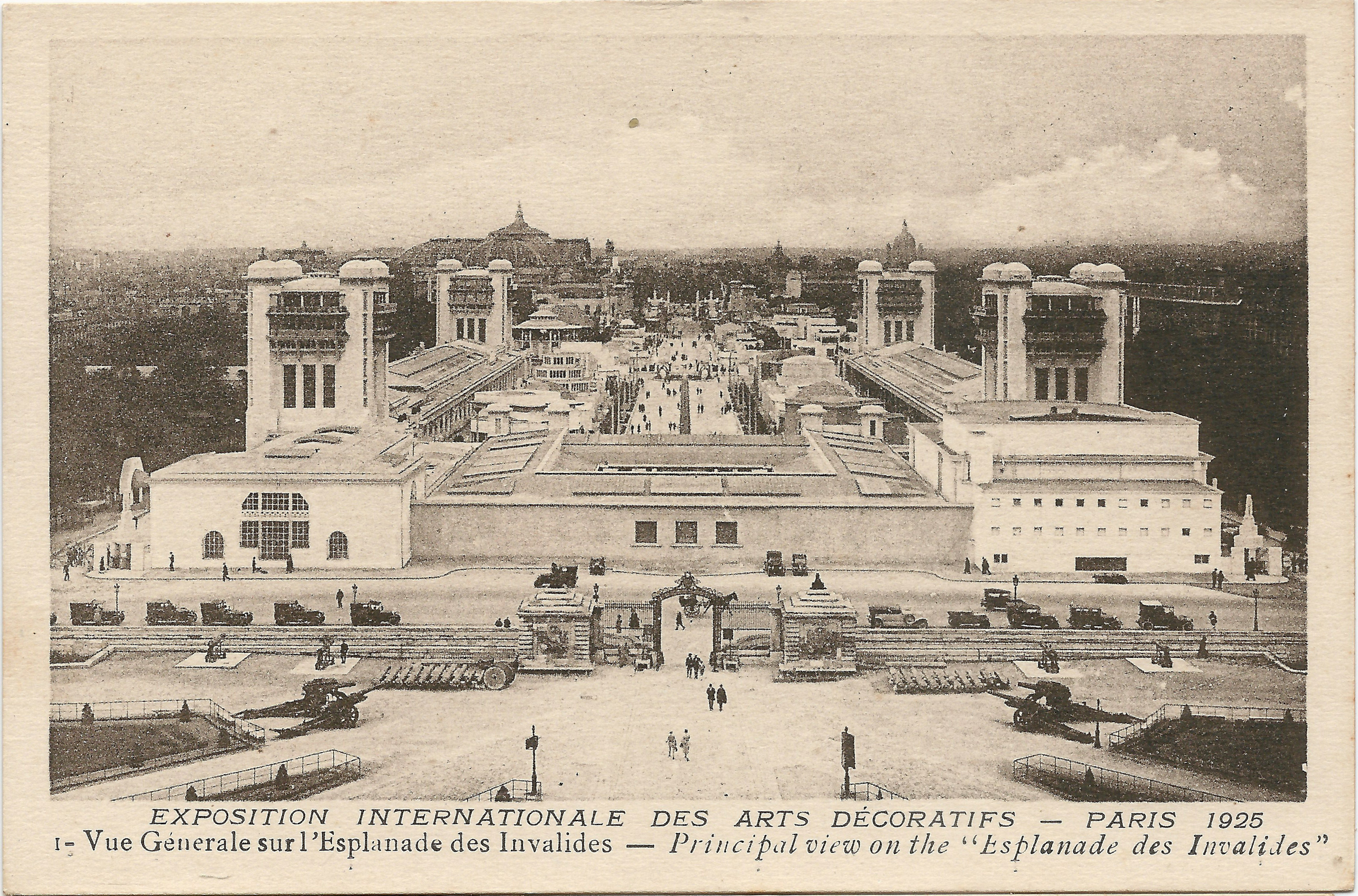
The view of the exposition from Les Invalides

The site chosen for the exposition was the center of Paris, around the Grand Palais, the enormous glass and iron pavilion which had been built for the 1900 Universal Exposition. The principal architect was Charles Plumet. The main entrance, called the Gate of Honor, was located next to the Grand Palais. The main axis stretched from the Gate of Honor across the Pont Alexandre III to Les Invalides with pavilions on both banks, while gardens and fountains were placed between the pavilions. The Pont Alexander III, which connected the two parts of the exposition, was turned into a modernist shopping mall by the architect Maurice Dufrêne. The banks of the Seine were lined with floating restaurants built for the exposition, which became a popular attraction.

There were thirteen gateways into the exposition, which were each designed by a different architect. The main entrance was at the Place de la Concorde, designed by architect Pierre Patout, with a statue of a woman in the center called "Welcome" by Louis Dejean. The pavilions of the major French stores and decorators were located on the main axis within the entrance. Another section was devoted to pavilions from designers from the French provinces, particularly from Nancy and Lyon. Another section was devoted to foreign pavilions and manufacturers, and another to the products of French colonies which could be used in decoration, particularly rare woods and products such as ivory and mother of pearl.

The tallest structure in the exposition, and one of the most modernist, was the tower of the Tourism Pavilion by Robert Mallet-Stevens. The tower's sleek lines and lack of ornament were an announcement of the international style that would replace Art Deco. In 1929 Mallet-Stevens led the creation of The French Union of Modern Artists which rebelled against the luxurious decorative styles shown at the exposition, and, along with Le Corbusier, demanded architecture without ornament, built with inexpensive and mass-produced materials.

== Pavilions of the French designers ==
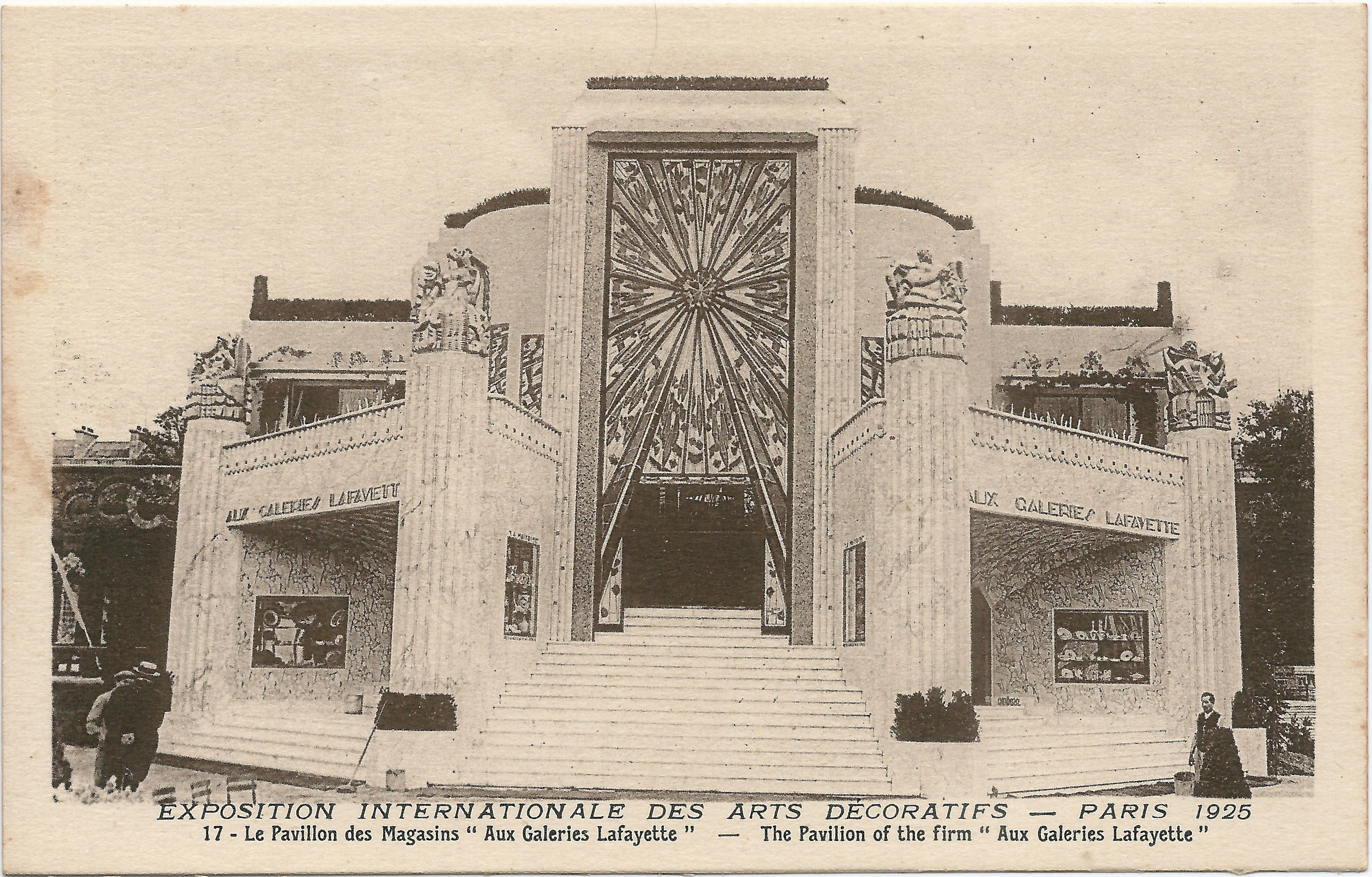
Pavilion of Galeries Lafayette department store

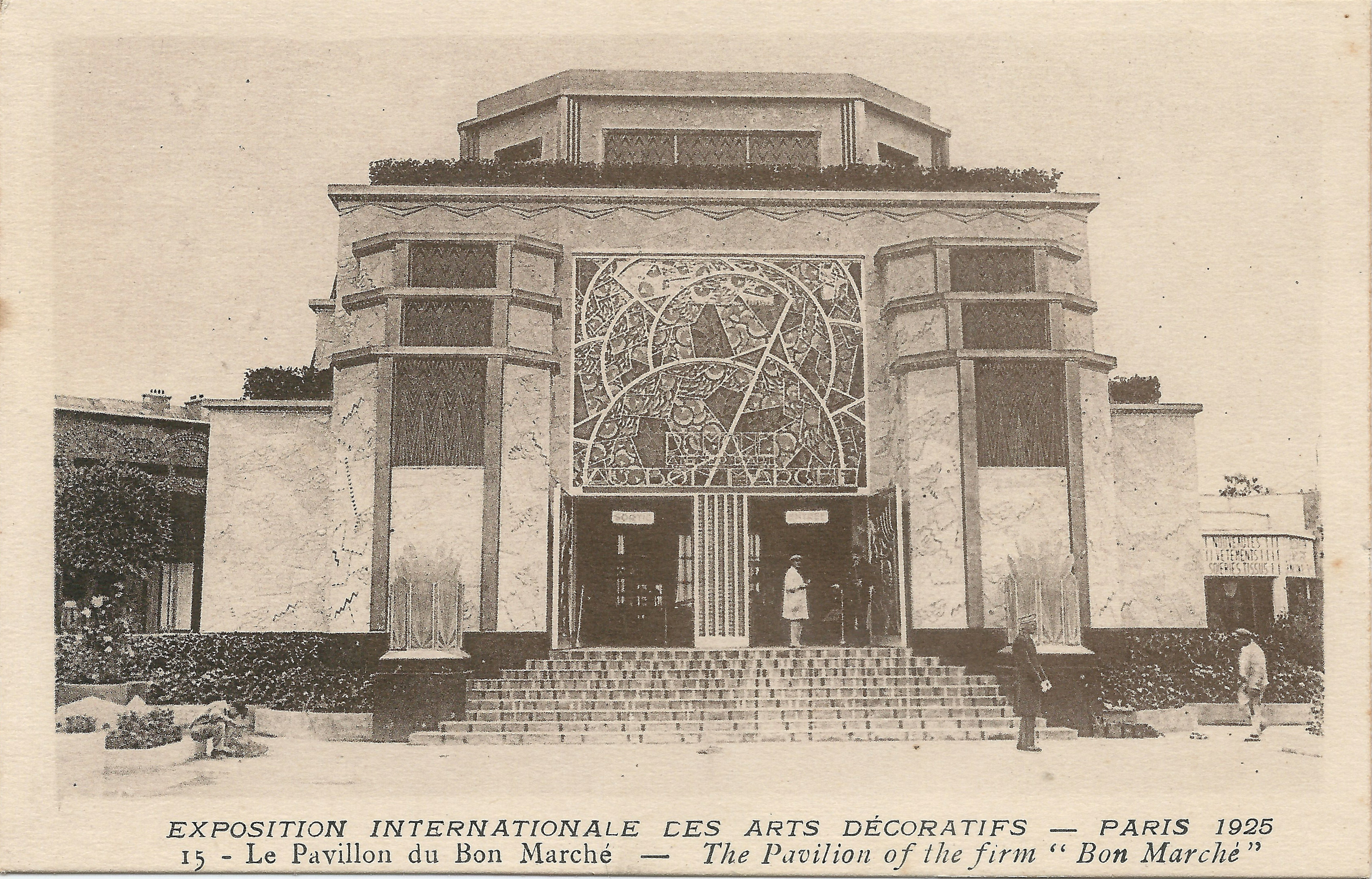
Pavilion of the Bon Marché department store

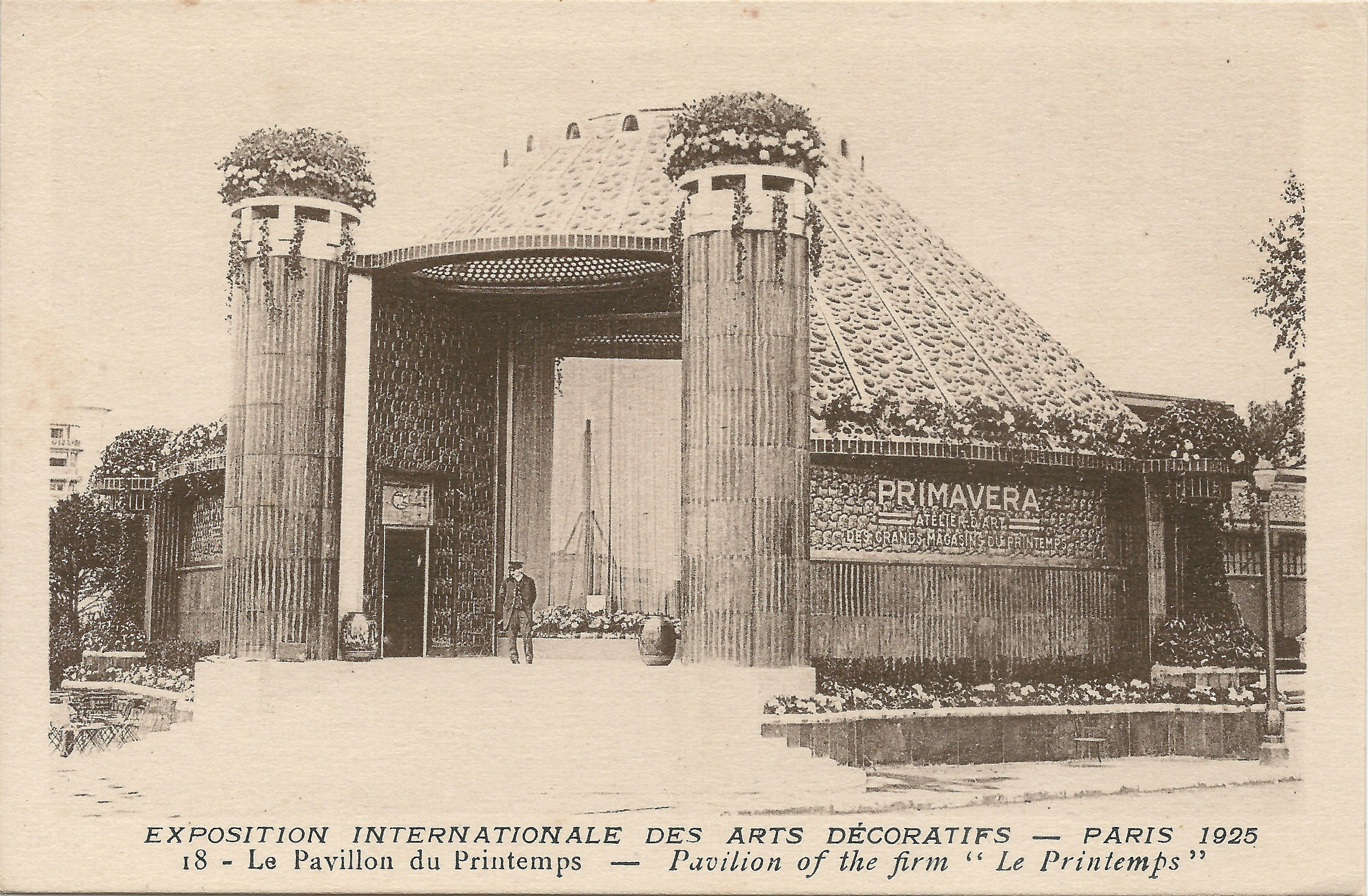
Pavilion of the Printemps department store

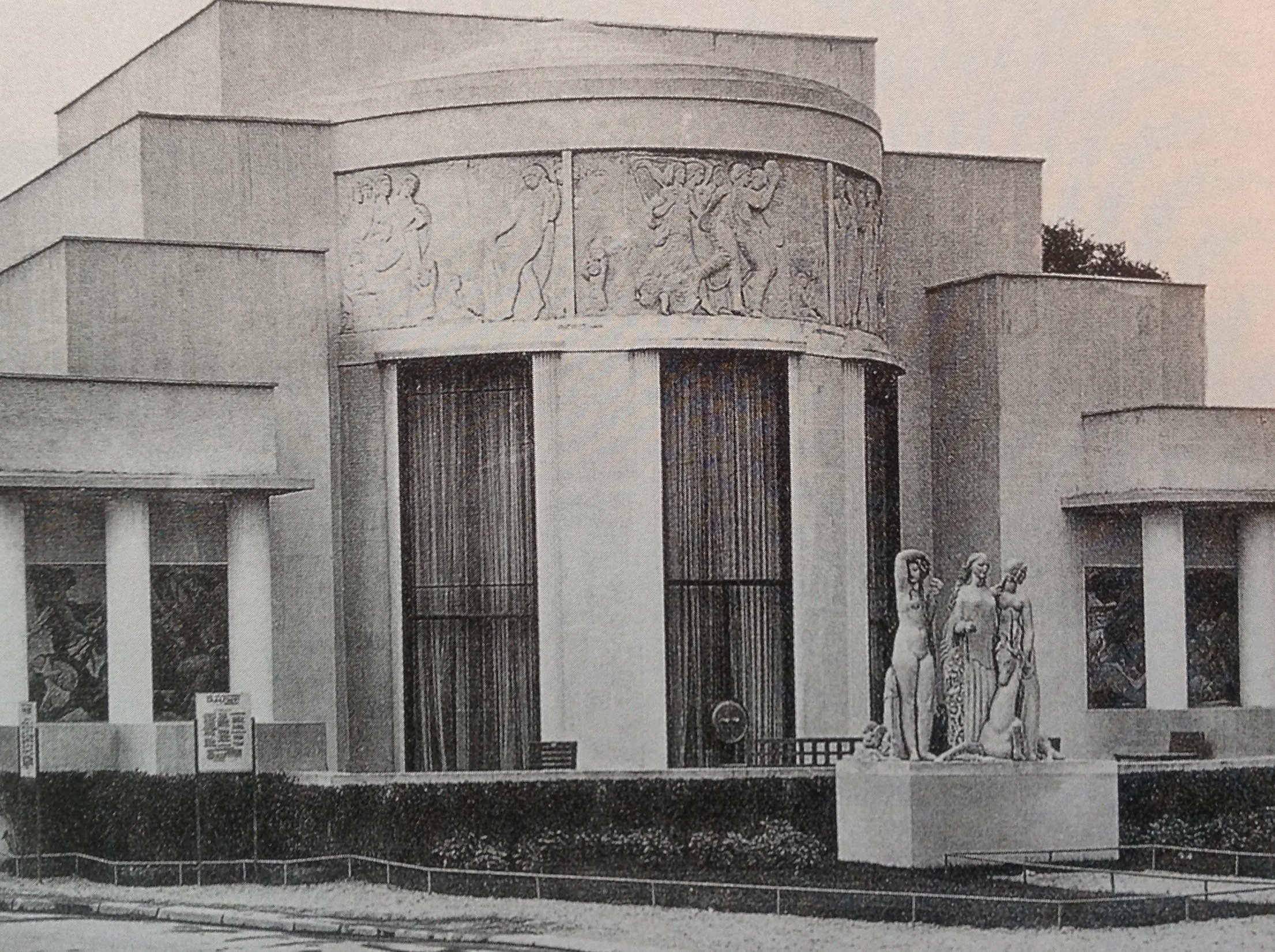
The Hôtel du Collectionneur was a showcase for the furniture of Émile-Jacques Ruhlmann.

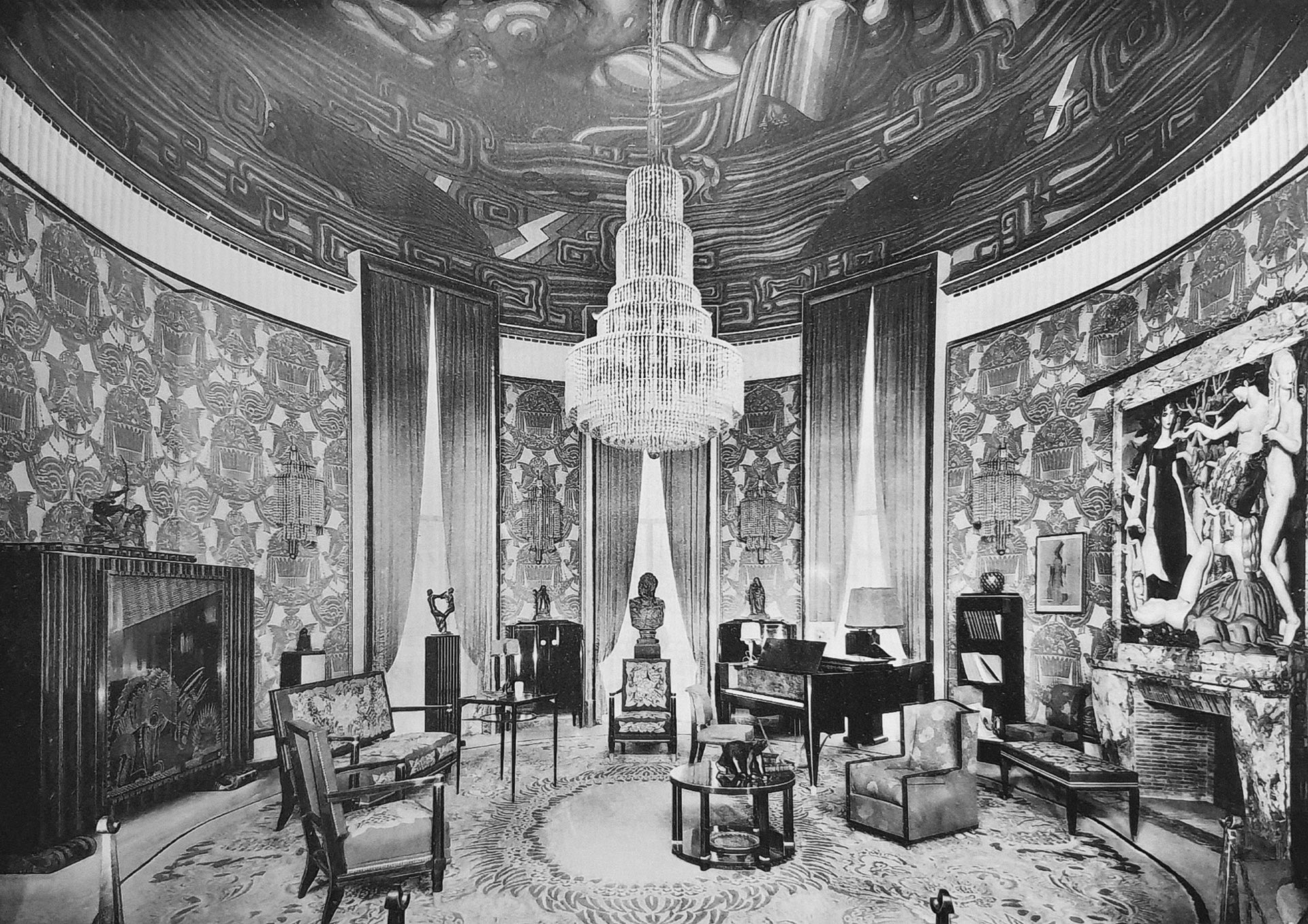
The salon of the Hôtel du Collectionneur, with furniture by Émile-Jacques Ruhlmann. and painting by Jean Dupas

The Pavilion of the L'Esprit Nouveau by Le Corbusier

Just inside the main entrance of the exposition on the Place de la Concorde was the main promenade of the exposition, with the pavilions of the major French department stores and manufacturers of luxury furniture, porcelain, glassware and textiles. Each pavilion was designed by a different architect, and they tried to outdo each other with colorful entrances, sculptural friezes, and murals of ceramics and metal. The modernist tower of the Pavilion of Tourism designed by Robert Mallet-Stevens stood out above the other pavilions. Inside each pavilion presented rooms with ensembles of furniture, carpets, paintings and other decorative objects.

Many of the exhibits were shown inside the Grand Palais, the enormous hall which had been built for the 1900 Universal Exposition. For the first time at an international exposition, pieces of furniture were displayed not as individual items but in rooms similar to those in a home, where all the decor was coordinated. The Hôtel du Collectionneur, for example, displayed the works of the furniture maker Émile-Jacques Ruhlmann, in rooms complete with paintings and fireplaces in the same modern style.

The most unusual, most modest, and, in the end, probably the most influential French pavilion was that of the magazine L'Esprit Nouveau, directed by Amédée Ozenfant and Le Corbusier. They had founded the Purist movement 1918, with the goal of eliminating all decoration in architecture, and replacing hand-made furniture with machine-made furniture. They founded L'Esprit Nouveau in 1920, and used it vigorously to attack traditional decorative arts. "Decorative art," Le Corbusier wrote, "as opposed to the machine phenomenon, is the final twitch of the old manual mode, and is a dying thing. Our pavilion will contain only standard things created by industry in factories and mass-produced, truly the objects of today." The Esprit Nouveau pavilion was almost hidden between two wings of the Grand Palais. It was made of concrete, steel and glass, with no ornament at all. The interiors had plain white walls with a few cubist paintings. Since trees on the site could not be cut down, Le Corbusier integrated a tree into the interior of the building, coming up through a hole in the roof. The furniture was simple, machine-made and mass-produced. The organizers of the exposition were horrified by the appearance of the building, and tried to hide it by building a fence. However, Le Corbusier appealed to the Ministry of Fine Arts, which sponsored the exhibition, and the fence was removed.

Within the pavilion building Le Corbusier exhibited his Plan Voisin for Paris. The Plan Voisin, named for aviation pioneer Gabriel Voisin, proposed the construction of a series of identical 200-meter-tall (660 ft) skyscrapers and lower rectangular apartments, that would replace the historic buildings on the right bank of the Seine in Paris. He had no expectation that central Paris would be demolished and his plan carried out; it was simply a way to attract attention to his ideas. The pavilion represented a single modular apartment, representing the identical machine-made houses which Le Corbusier believed were the future of modern architecture.

== Foreign pavilions ==
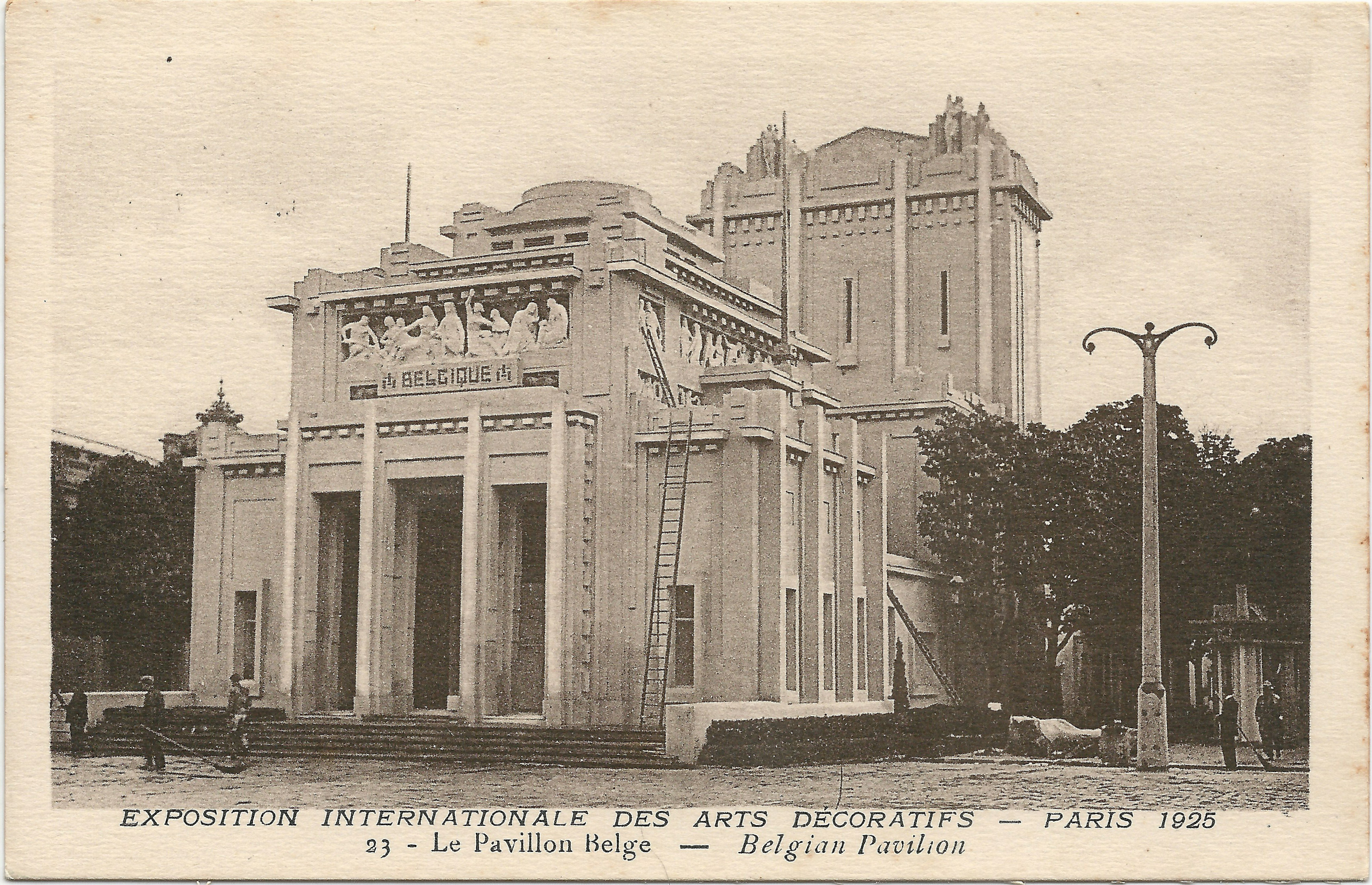
The Belgian pavilion, by Victor Horta

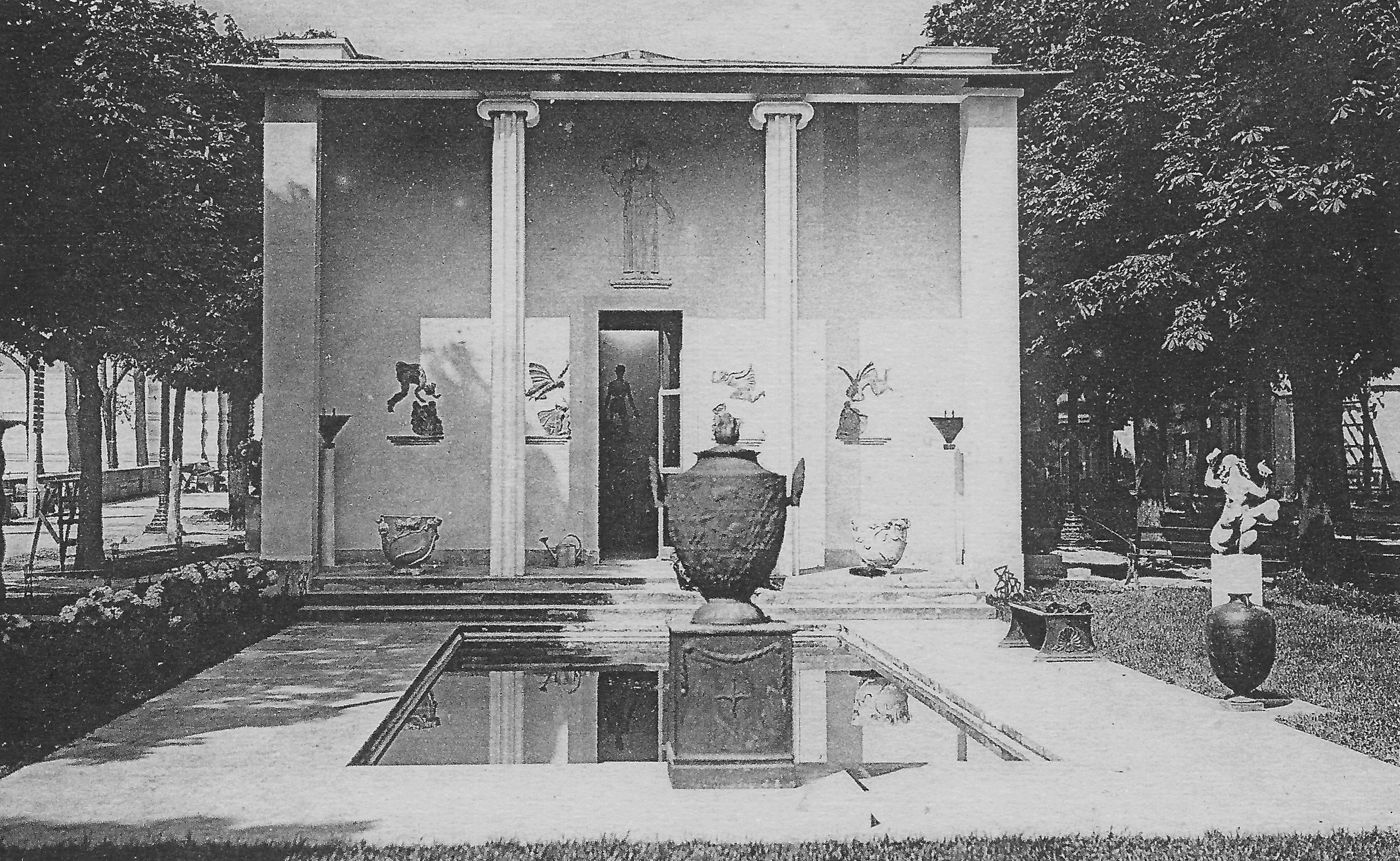
The Swedish pavilion by Carl Bergsten

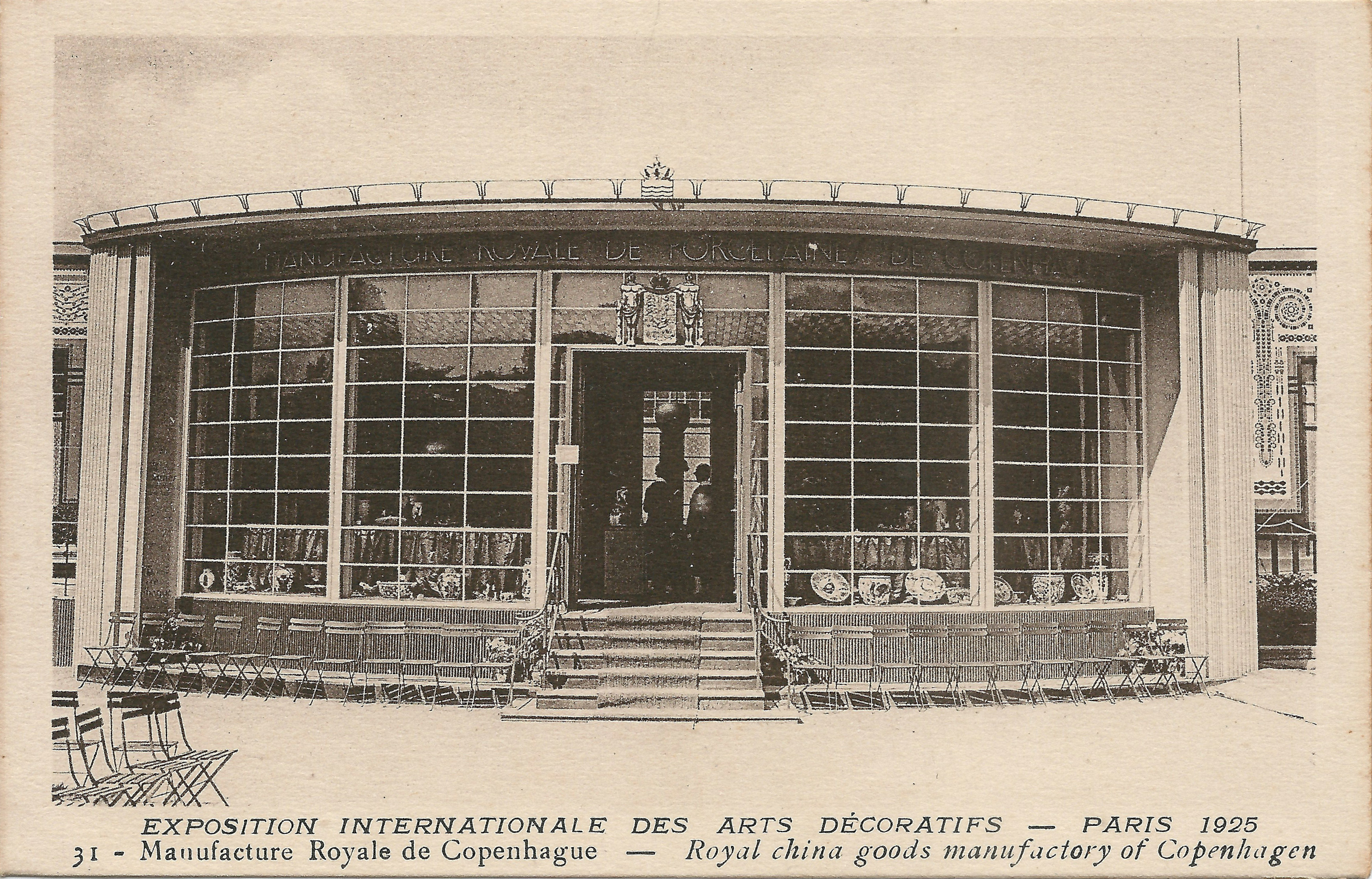
The Danish pavilion for presenting porcelain and faience

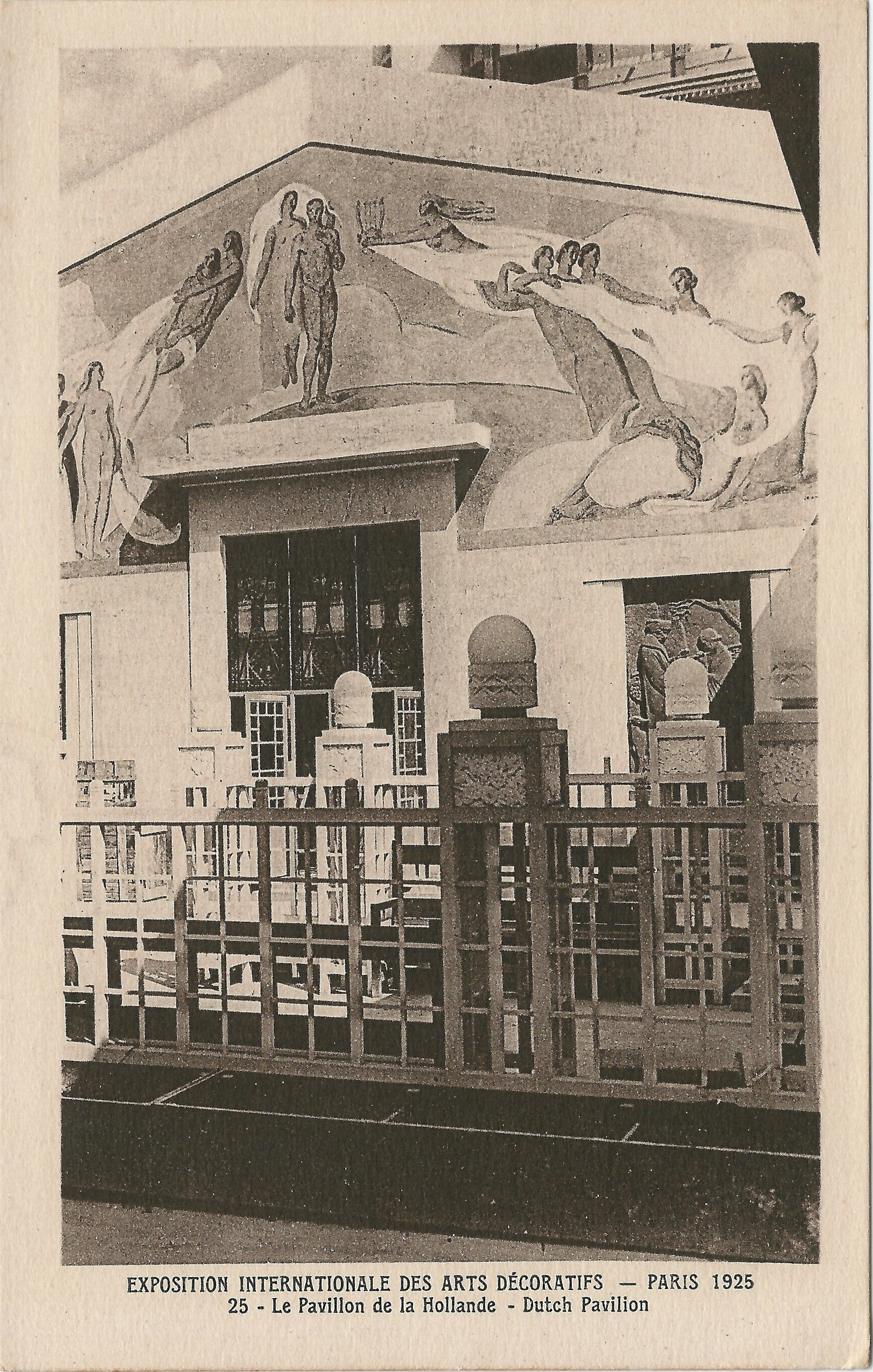
The Dutch pavilion

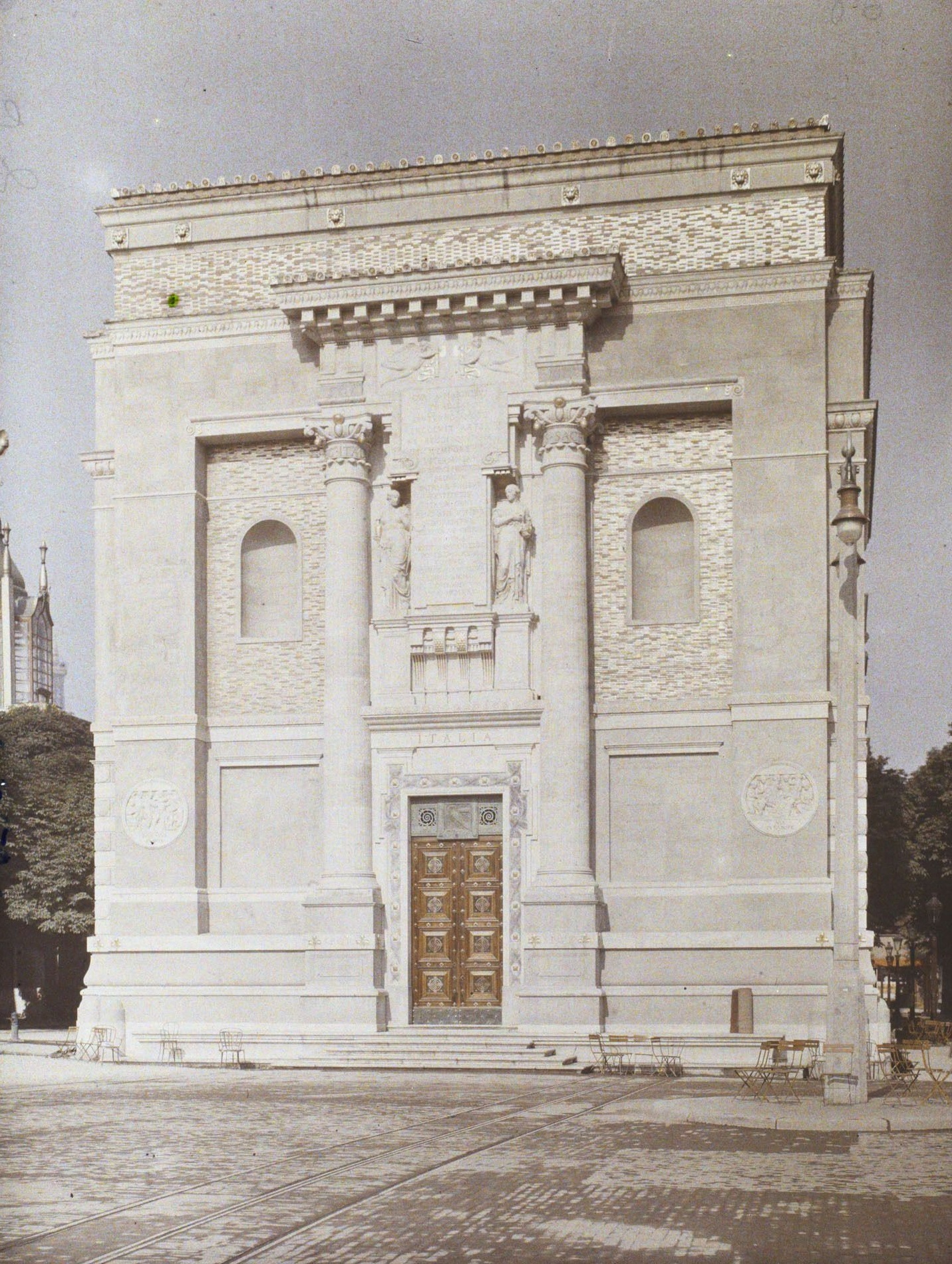
The Italian pavilion by Armando Brasini

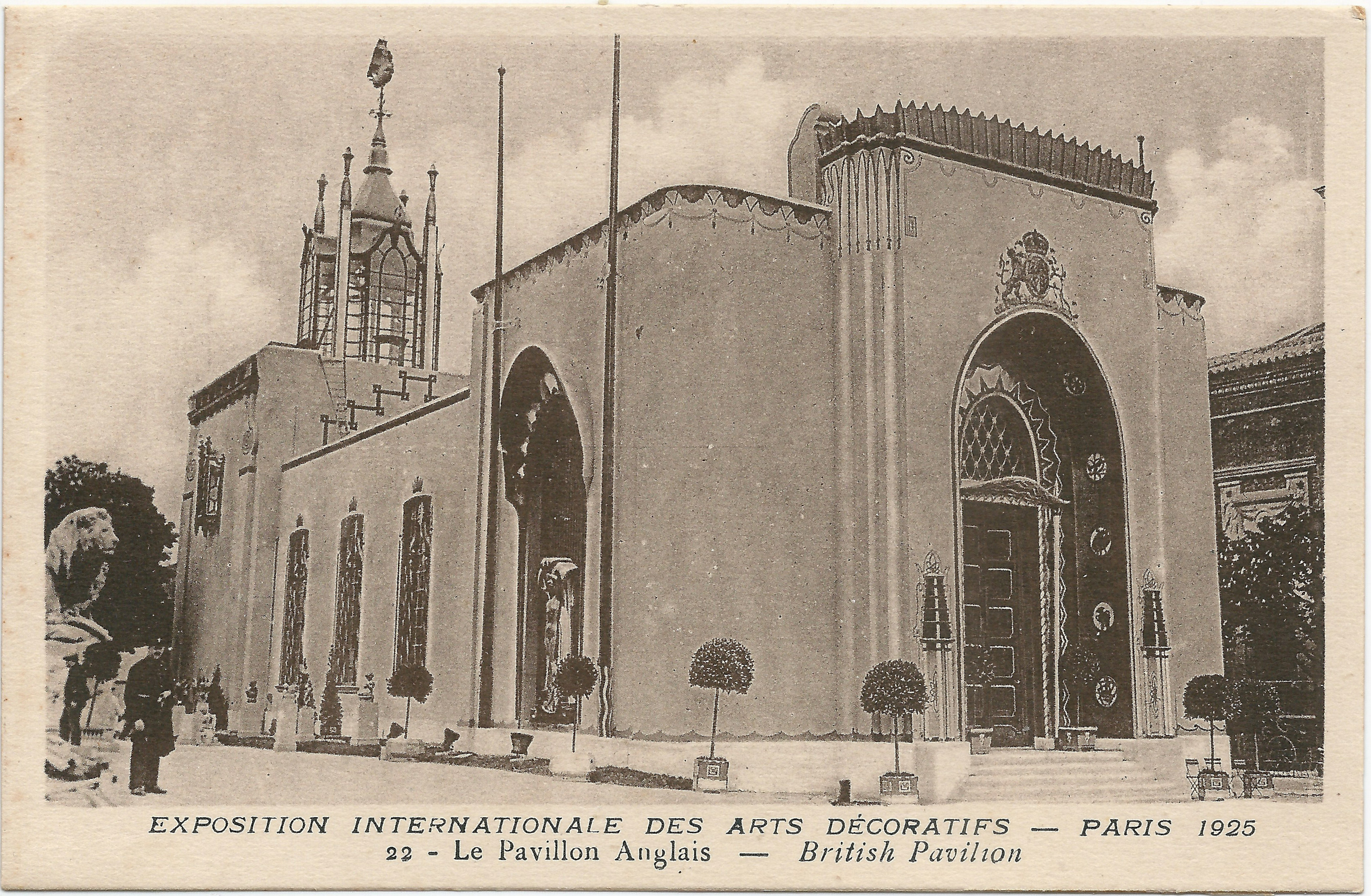
The British Pavilion by Easton and Robertson

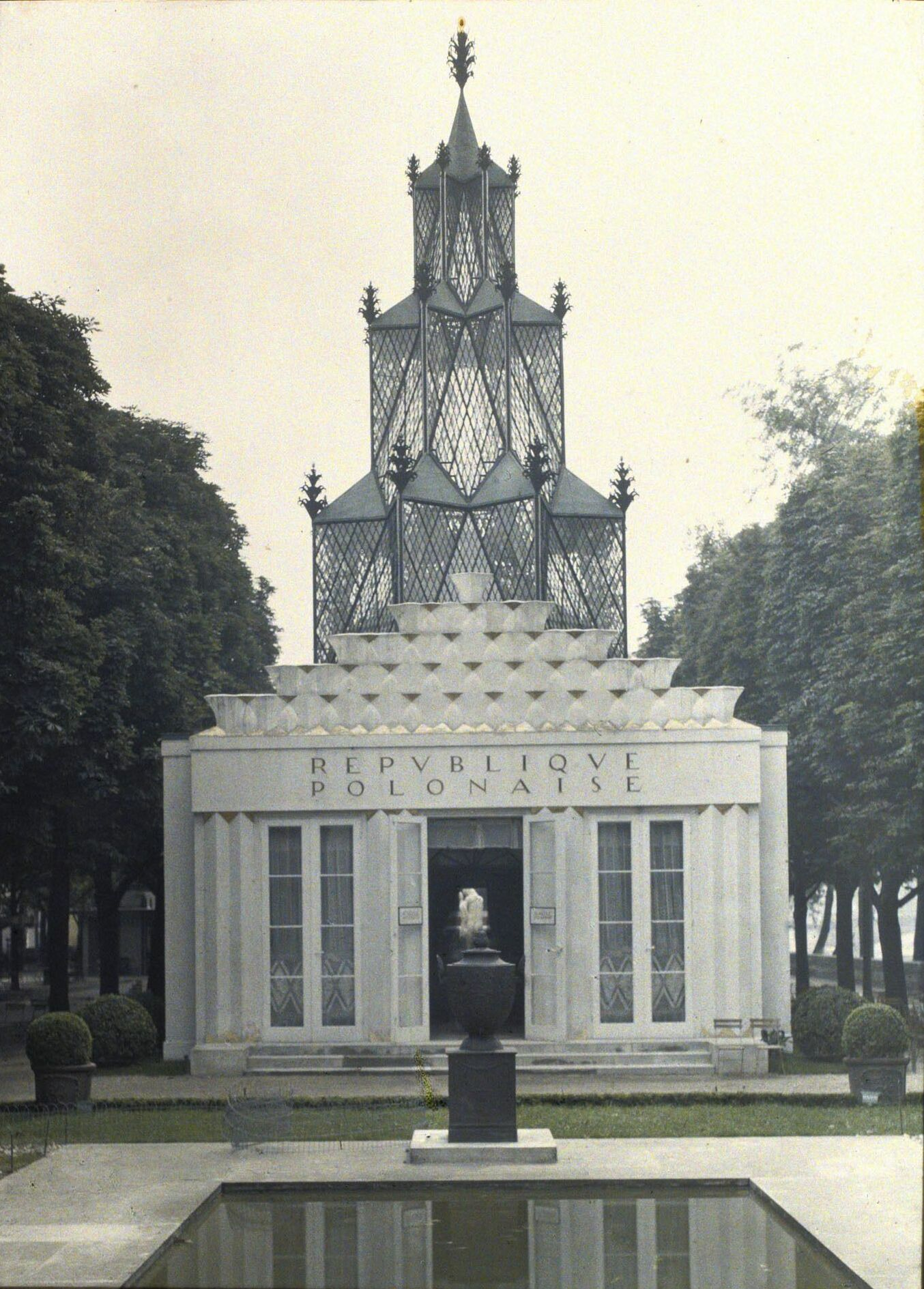
Pavilion of Poland by Joseph Czajkowski

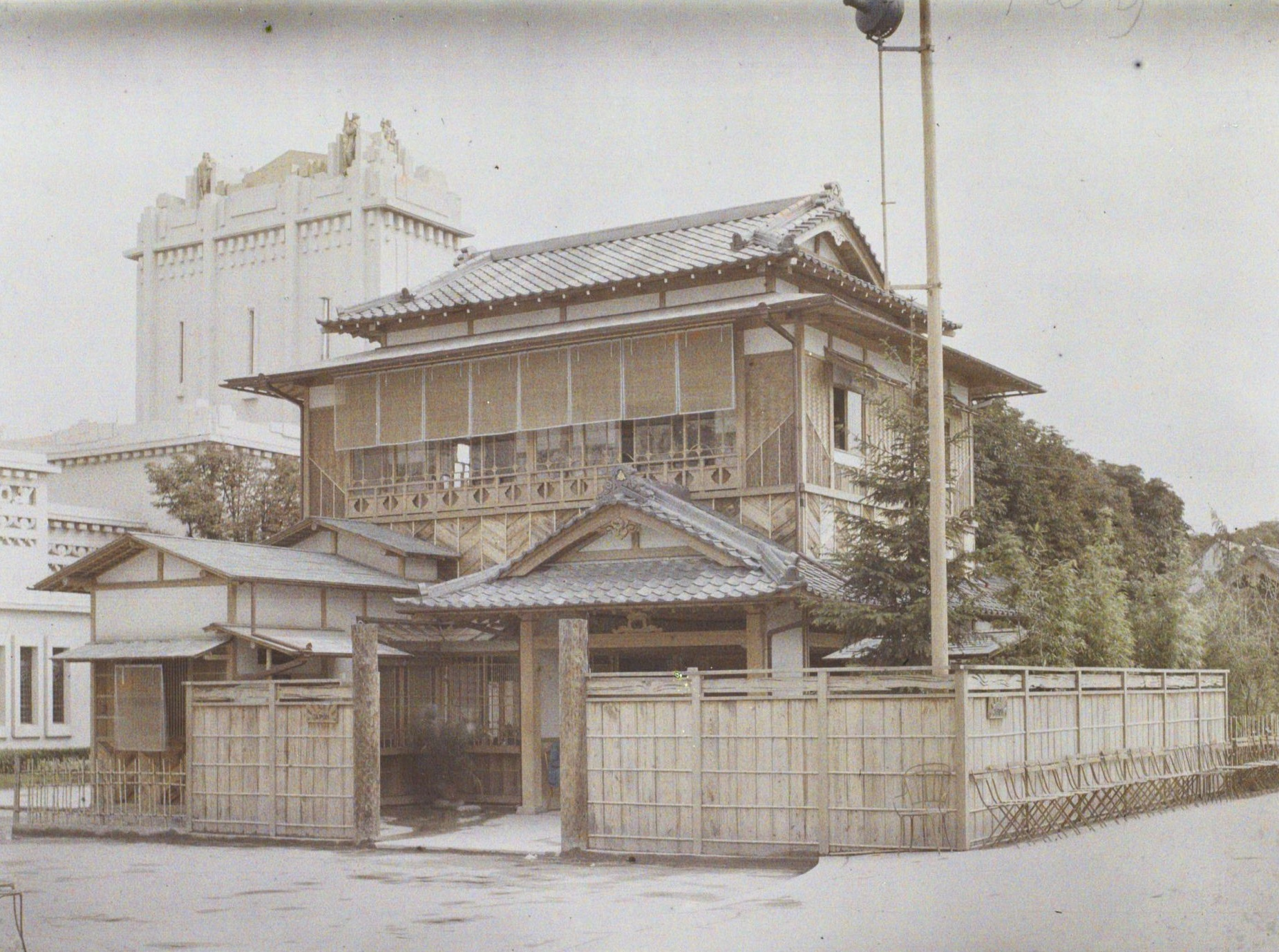
The pavilion of Japan by Shichigoro Yamada and Iwakichi Miyamoto

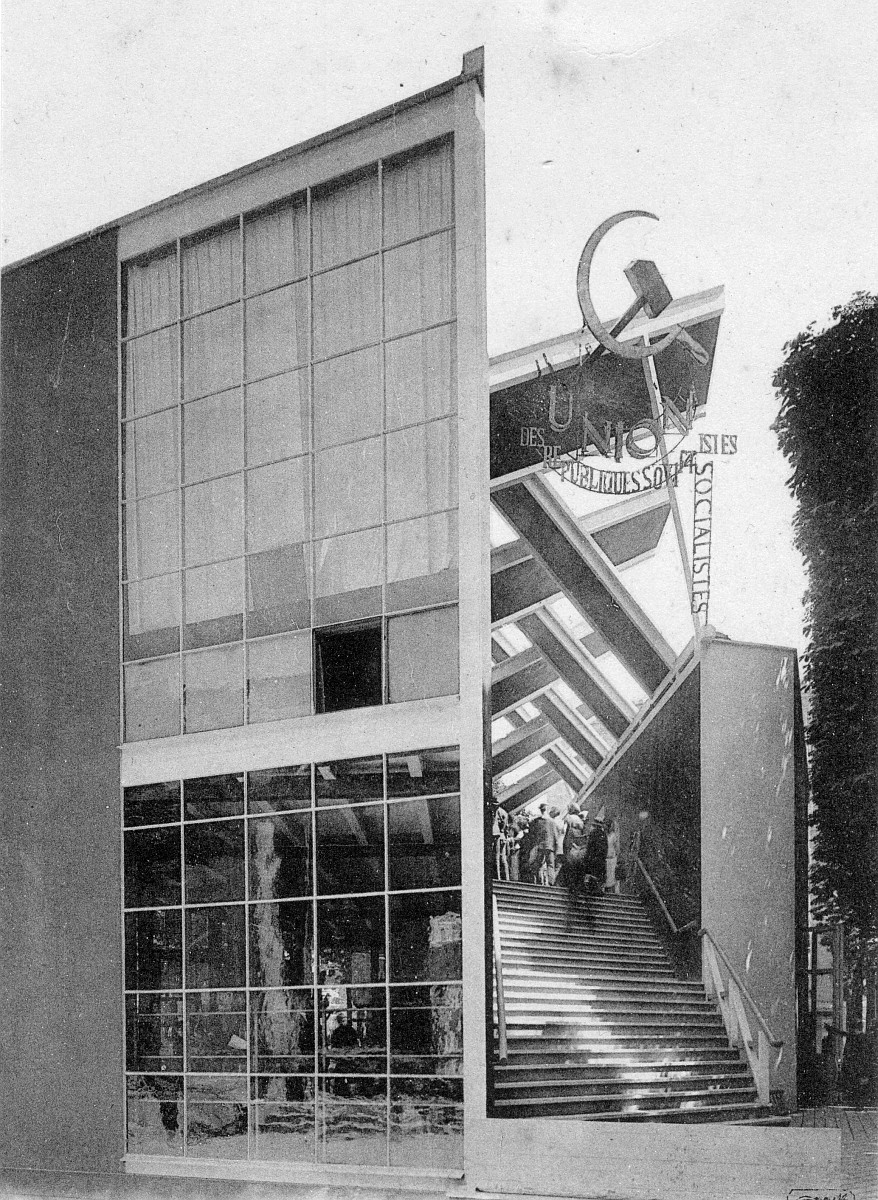
Pavilion of the Soviet Union, by Konstantin Melnikov

Some twenty countries participated in the exhibit. Germany was not invited because of its role in World War I, but Austria and Hungary were invited, as was the new Soviet Union, though it was not yet officially recognized by France. Many countries had exhibits of furniture and decoration within the Grand Palais, and also built pavilions to illustrate new ideas in architecture. Britain, Italy, Spain, Belgium and the Netherlands all had substantial pavilions, as did the Scandinavian countries, Poland, and Czechoslovakia. Japan had an important pavilion, while China had only a modest representation. The United States, not entirely understanding the purpose of the exhibition, chose not to participate.

Austria was a major participant, thanks to the work of Josef Hoffmann, who designed the Austrian pavilion next to the Seine. The complex included a terrace by the Seine, a tower, a cubic glass and iron exhibit hall by Peter Behrens, and a brightly decorated cafe. The pavilion contained works of sculpture by the modernists Anton Hanak and Eugene Steinhof.

Belgium was also a major participant; the country had a large exposition of furniture and design on the main floor of the Grand Palais, and a separate pavilion, designed by Victor Horta, the pioneer of Art Nouveau architecture. Belgium had been left in ruins by the War, and the Belgian exhibit had a low budget; the pavilion was made of wood, plaster and other low-cost materials. Horta's pavilion had a rectangular tower, crowned with six statues by Wolfers, representing decorative arts through the ages. The interior displayed tapestries, glass and decoration in the new style. Belgian artists taking part included the architects Paul Hamesse, Henry van de Velde, Flor Van Reeth and Victor Bourgeois, the decorator Léon Sneyers and textile artist Elisabeth de Saedeleer.

The pavilion of Denmark, by Kay Fisker, was a striking block of red and white bricks, making a Danish cross. Inside were murals by Mogens Lorentzen inspired by ancient maps of Denmark, with colorful and fantastic images. A separate building, symmetrical with the first, was filled with light and displayed the works of the Danish manufactory of porcelain and faience.

The pavilion of Sweden was designed by Carl Bergsten, while the Swedish display in the Grand Palais featured a model of the new art deco city hall of Stockholm, by Ragnar Ostberg. The small pavilion was a deco version of classicism, pure and simple; it was reflected in a pool, and discreetly ornamented with deco statues.

The pavilion of the Netherlands, designed by Jan Frederik Staal, was designed to capture in a modern style the mystery and luxury of the East Indies, where the country had colonies. An enormous roof like that of a pagoda covered the structure; the façade was decorated with colorful murals, and the structure was reflected in brick-lined pools.

The pavilion of Italy by Armando Brasini was a large classical block built of concrete and covered with decoration in marble, ceramics and gilded bricks. In the center was an enormous head of a man in bronze by the sculptor Adolfo Wildt.

The pavilion of Great Britain, by the architects John Murray Easton and Howard Robertson, resembled an art deco cathedral. It was decorated on the outside with colorful flags, and in the inside with stained glass, murals and polychrome façade, with arabesques and oriental themes. The interior opened out to a restaurant on a platform next to the Seine.

The pavilion of Poland was designed by Józef Czajkowski. It had a flamboyant glass and iron tower with geometric facets, a deco versio of the picturesque churches of Poland in the 17th and 18th centuries. The pavilion was also inspired by architecture of traditional manor house of Polish nobility and by Zakopane Style. Mix of all was an attempt to create the Polish national style. The octagonal hall, supported on wooden pillars, had a skylight of deco stained glass, and was filled with deco statuary and tapestries. Polish graphic arts were also successfully represented. Tadeusz Gronowski and Zofia Stryjeńska won the Grand Prix in that category.

The pavilion of Japan by Shichigoro Yamada and Iwakichi Miyamoto was in the classical Japanese tradition, but with the use of both traditional materials, such as straw and varnished wood, combined with highly refined lacquered decoration. It was built in Japan, transported to France and assembled by Japanese workers.

The pavilion of the Soviet Union was one of the most unusual in the exposition. It was created by a young Russian architect, Konstantin Melnikov, who in 1922 had designed the new central market in Moscow, and who also designed the sarcophagus in Lenin's Mausoleum in Moscow. He had a very low budget, and built his structure entirely of wood and glass. A stairway crossed the structure diagonally on the exterior, allowing visitors to see the interior of the exhibit from above. The roof over the stairway was not continuous, but was made up of planes of wood suspended at an angle, which were supposed to let in fresh air and keep rain out, but visitors were sometimes drenched. The exhibits inside included models of projects for various Soviet monuments. The interior of the pavilion was designed by Alexander Rodchenko. The key element of the furnishings was the Workers’ Club which Rodchenko designed as an optimal model space for self-education and cultural leisure activities. The intent of the building was to attract attention, and it certainly succeeded; it was one of the most talked-about buildings in the exposition.

== Decorative arts ==
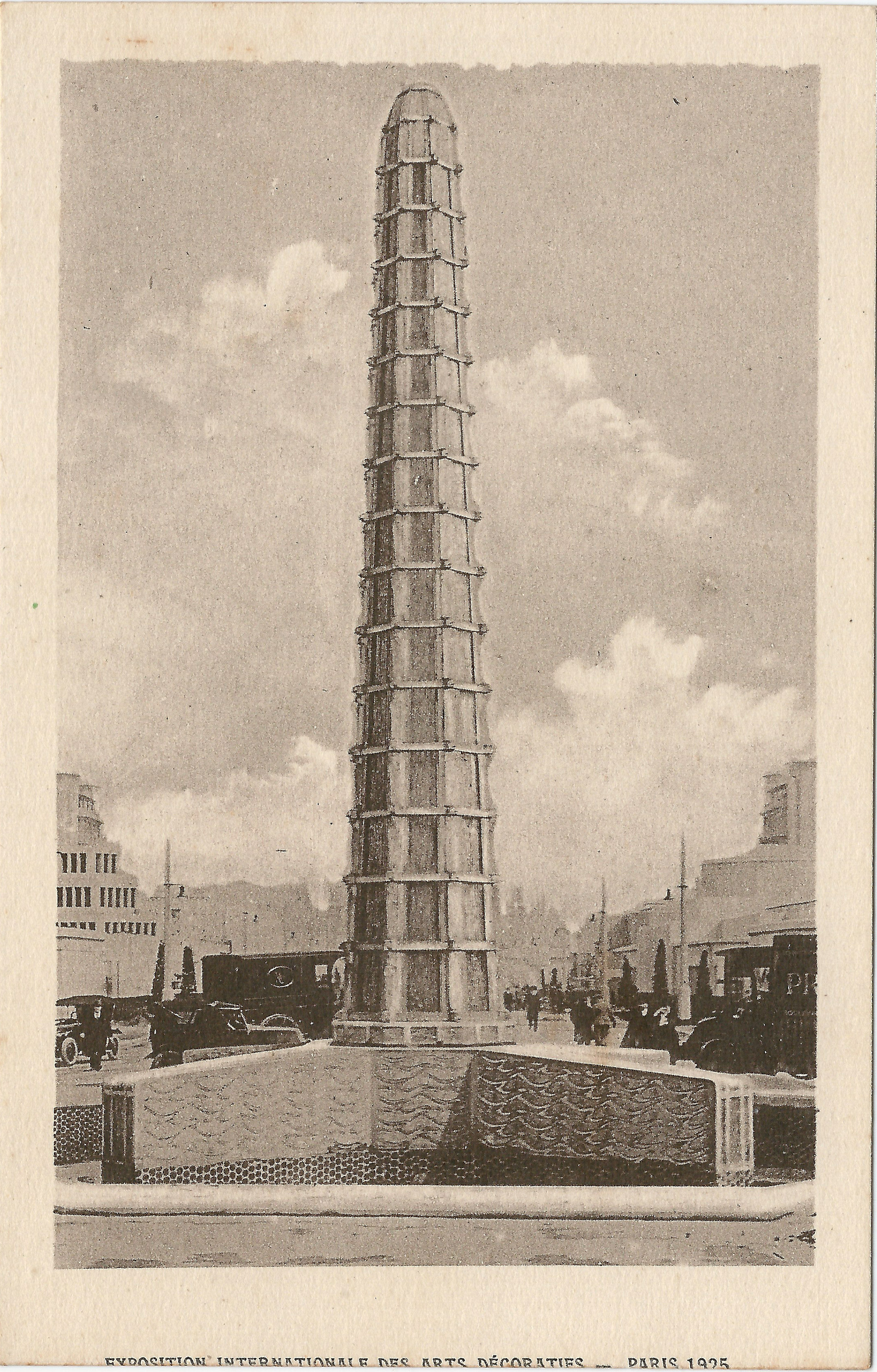
The illuminated crystal fountain at the exposition, by René Lalique

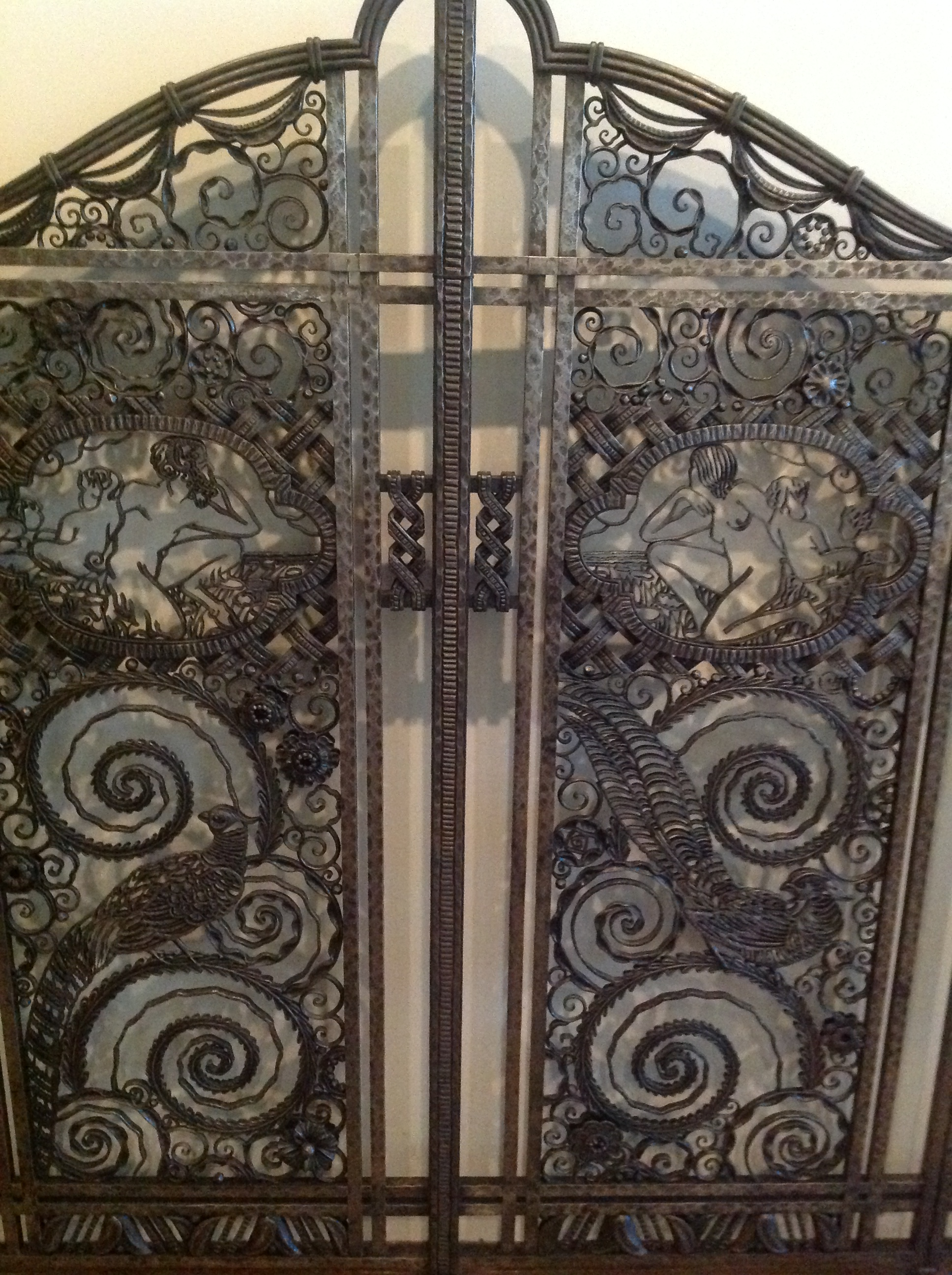
A grille with two wings called "The Pheasants", made by Paul Kiss and displayed at the exposition.

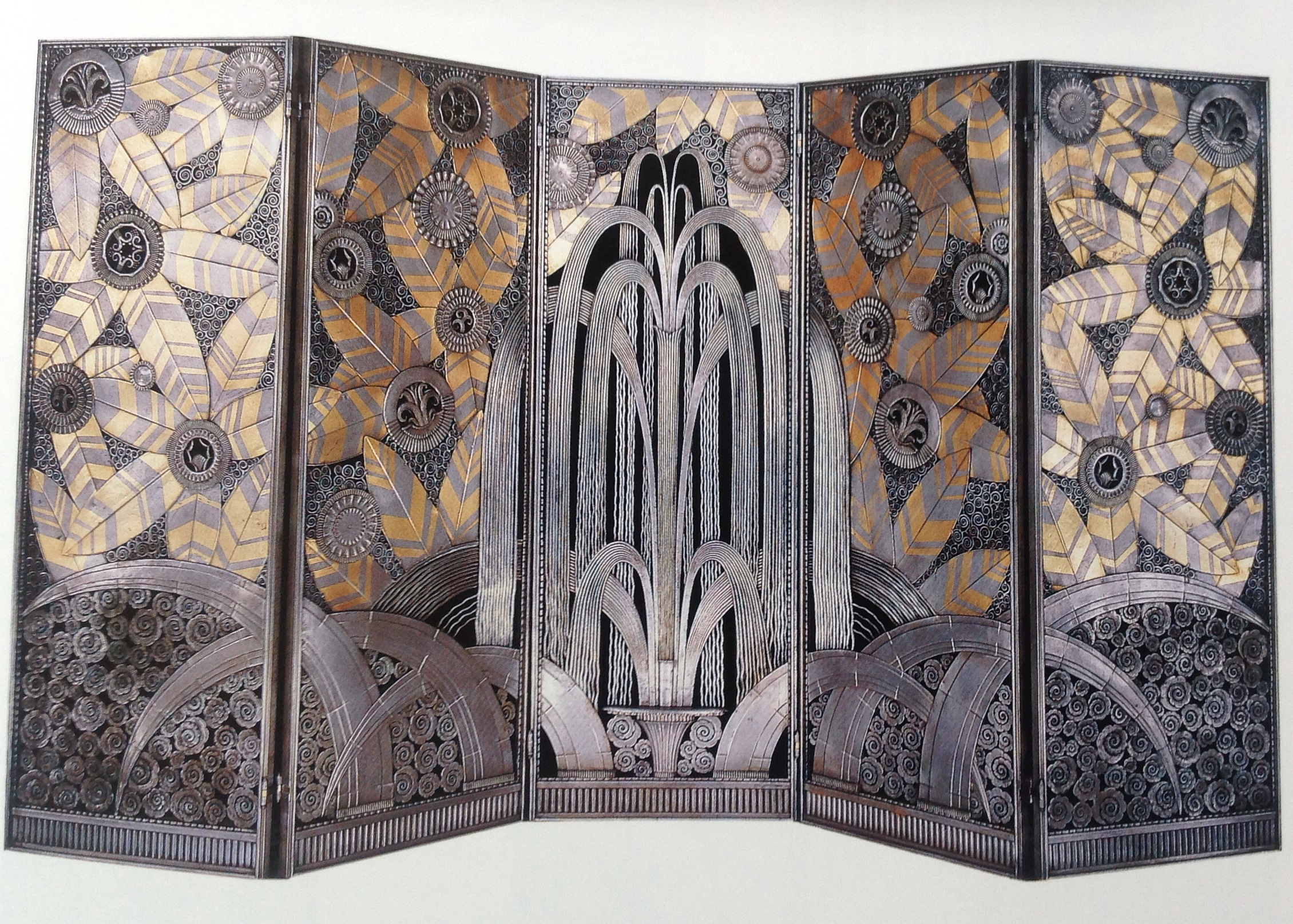
Iron and copper screen called "Oasis" by Edgar Brandt. Brandt also designed the ornamental gates at the main entrance of the exposition.

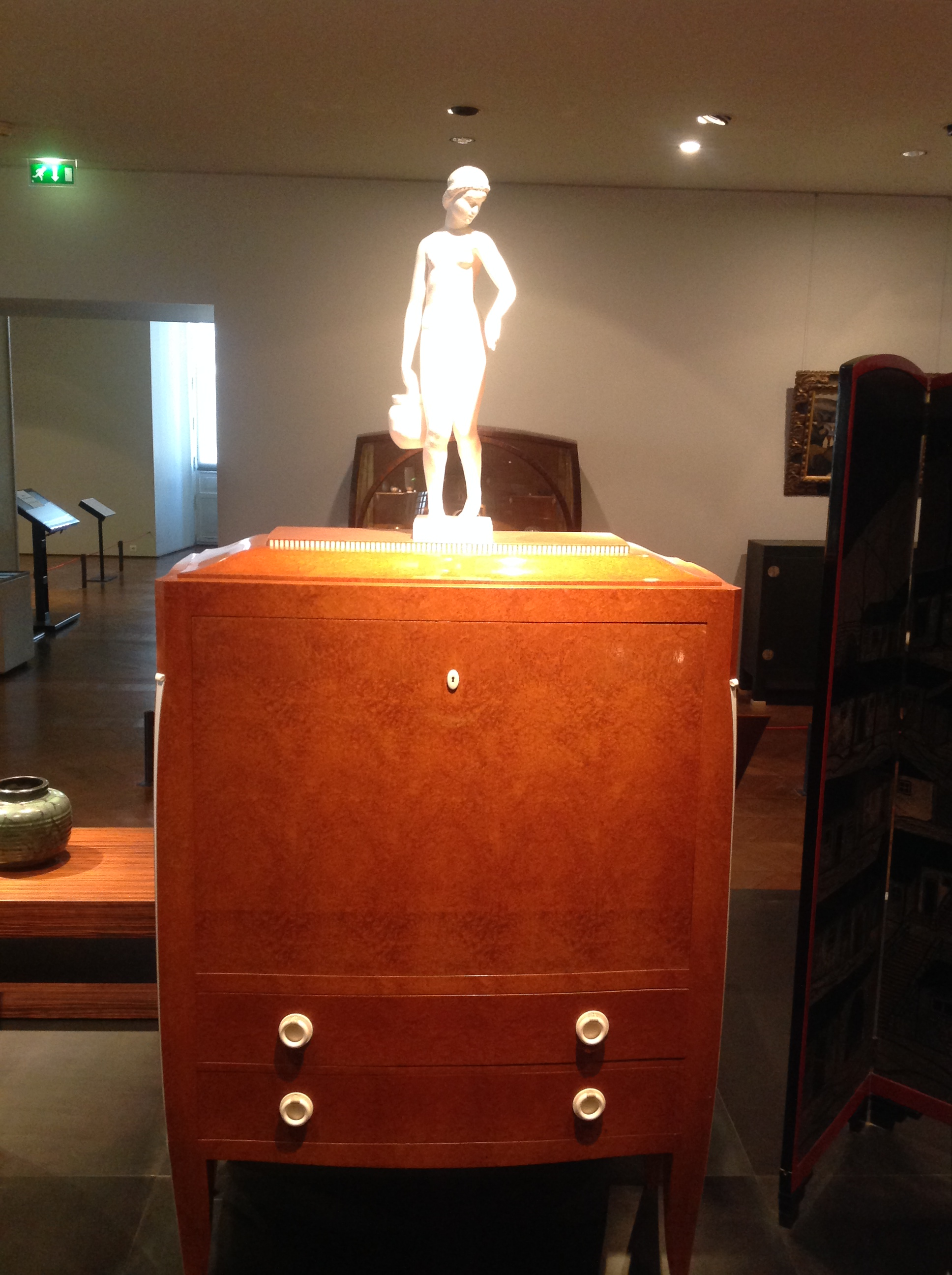
A cabinet by Emile-Jacques Ruhlmann displayed in the Maison du Collectionneur

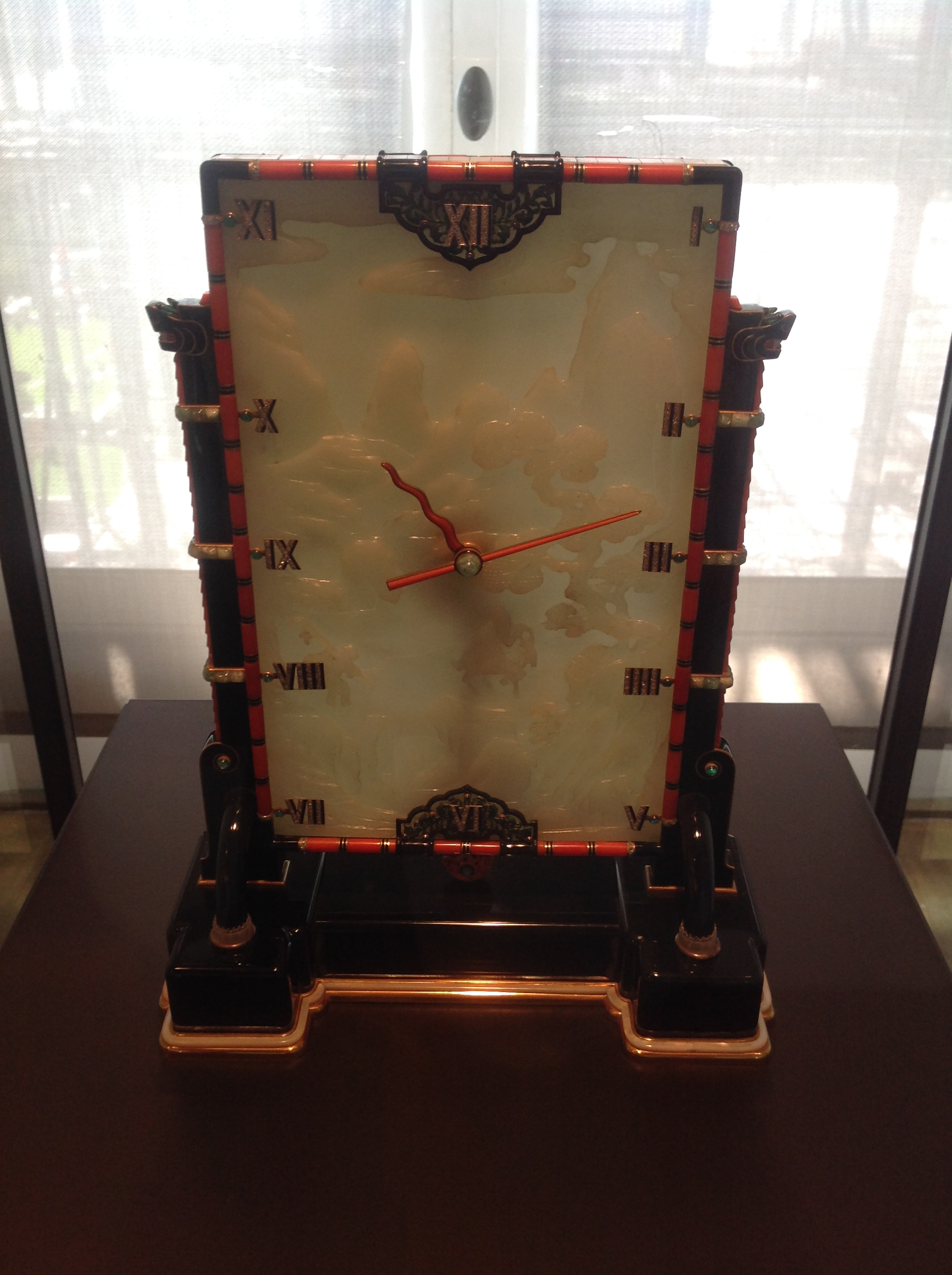
A clock made of white jade, onyx, diamonds, coral, mother of pearl and gold, by Louis Cartier and Maurice Couët (1923–27)

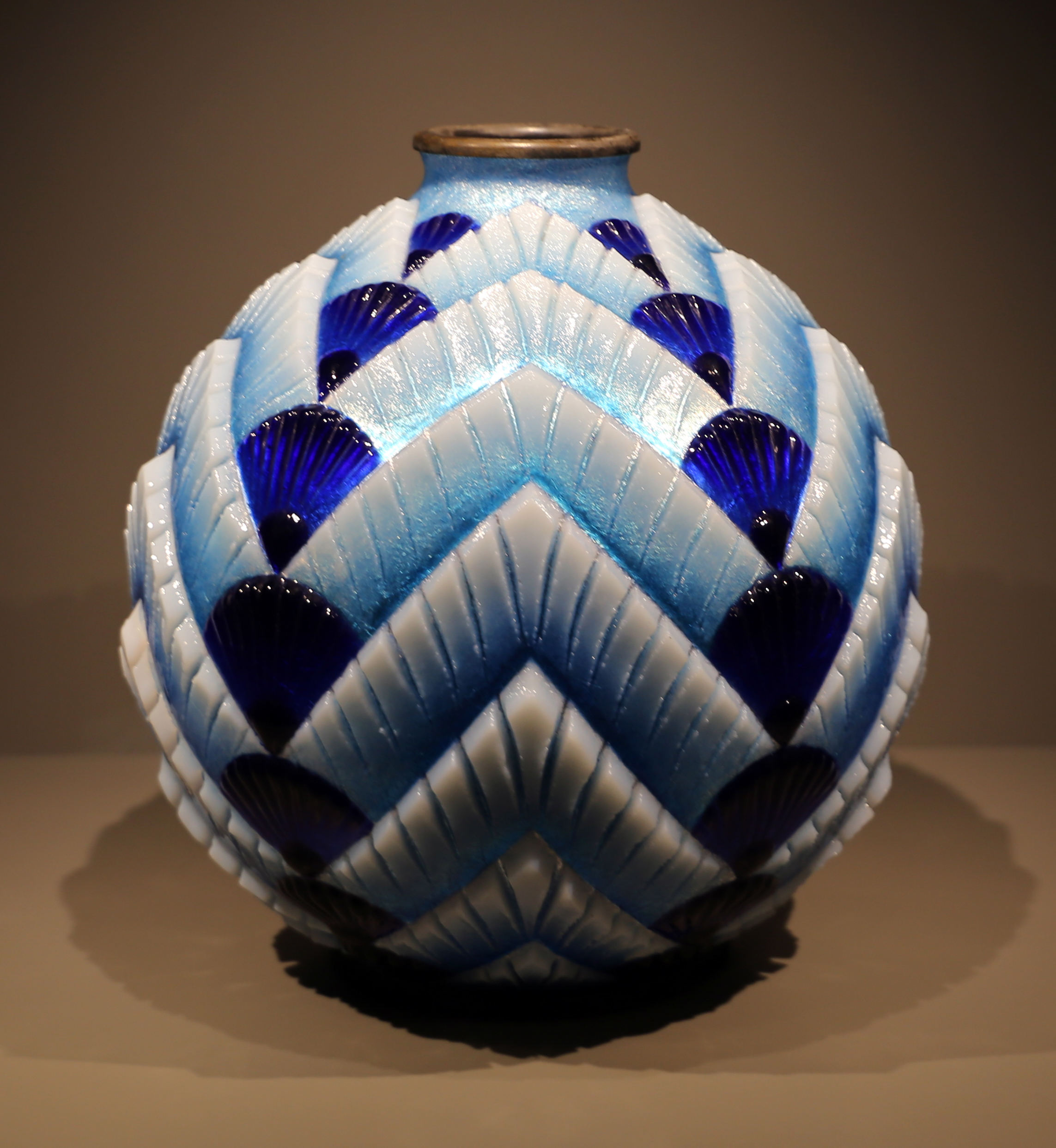
A Limoges vase by Camille Fauré (1874-1956)

Following the program of the French organizers of the exposition, the objects on display, from furniture to glassware and metalwork, all expressed a new style, a combination of modernist forms made with traditional French craftsmanship. The furniture, glassware, metalwork, fabrics and objects displayed were made with rare and expensive materials such as ebony, ivory, mother of pearl, sharkskin, and exotic woods from around the world, but the forms they used were very distinct from Art Nouveau or the preceding historic styles. They used geometric forms, straight lines, zigzag patterns, stylized garlands of flowers and baskets of fruit, to create something new and different. The firm of Lalique, best known for its delicate Art Nouveau glasswork, produced an art deco crystal fountain, illuminated from within, which became one of the landmarks of the exposition. The Maison d'un Collectionneur, the pavilion of the furniture maker Jacques-Emile Ruhlmann, showed what an art deco house could look like, with an art Deco painting, sculpture by Antoine Bourdelle, a painting by Jean Dupas, and fine craftsmanship.

An alternative view of future of Decoration was also on display at the exposition, within the white cube of the pavilion of the Esprit Nouveau. Here Le Corbusier displayed prototypes of mass-produced pieces of inexpensive furniture, made with inexpensive materials, which he saw as the future of interior design.

== Attractions and amusements ==
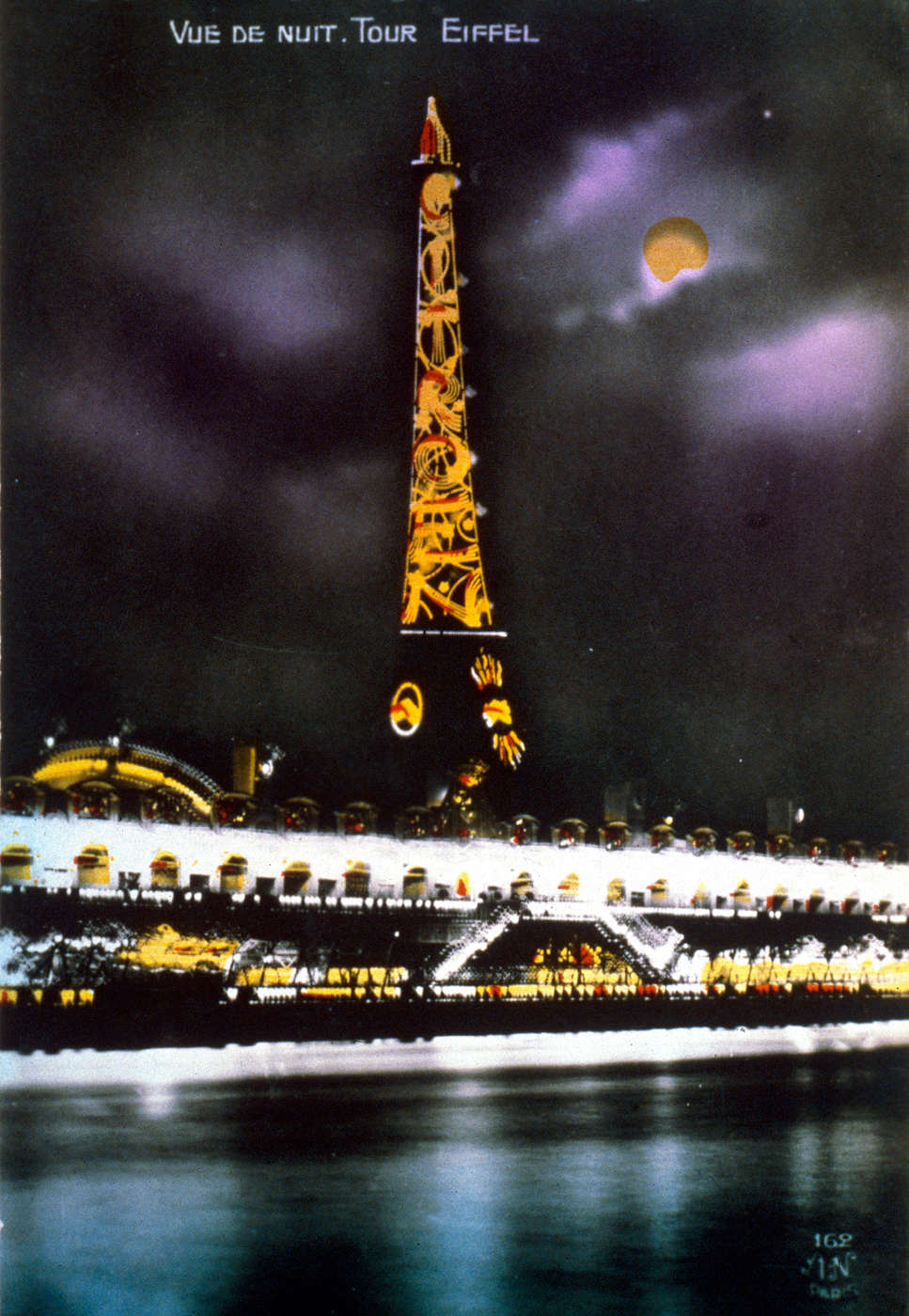
The Eiffel Tower was turned into an illuminated advertisement for Citroën during the exhibition

Large areas were devoted to amusements, from shooting galleries to merry-go-rounds, cafes and theaters. A miniature village was created for children, and there were stages which presented plays, ballets, singers and cultural programs from the participating countries. The exposition also was the venue for fashion shows, parades, and beauty contests, as well as frequent fireworks displays.

The Eiffel Tower was not within the site, but it was clearly visible from the exhibition. The Citroën Company decorated the tower from top to bottom with two hundred thousand light bulbs in six colors. The lights could be controlled from a keyboard, and presented nine patterns, including geometric shapes and circles, a shower of stars, the signs of the zodiac, and, most prominently, the name CITROËN.

A gigantic banquet and gala was held on 16 June 1925, within the Grand Palais. It featured the American dancer Loie Fuller, with her dance students appearing to swim through gauze veils; the dancer Eva Le Galienne as Joan of Arc and the dancer Ida Rubenstein as the Golden Angel, in a costume by Léon Bakst; the singer Mistinguett in the costume of a diamond, surrounded by the troupe of the Casino de Paris dressed as gemstones; and short performances by the full companies of the Comédie-Française and the Paris Opera, the Folies Bergère and the Moulin Rouge. The finale was the "Ballet of Ballets" danced by three hundred dancers from all of the Paris ballet companies in white tutus.

== The legacy of the exhibition ==
The exposition accomplished its goal, to show that Paris still reigned supreme in the arts of design. The term "Art Deco" was not yet used, but in the years immediately following the exposition, the art and design shown there was copied around the world, in the skyscrapers of New York, the ocean liners that crossed the Atlantic, and movie theatres around the world. It had a major influence in the design of fashion, jewellery, furniture, glass, metalwork, textiles and other decorative arts. At the same time, it displayed the growing difference between the traditional modern style, with its expensive materials, fine craftsmanship and lavish decoration, and the modernist movement that wanted to simplify art and architecture. The Esprit Nouveau pavilion and the Soviet pavilion were distinctly not decorative, they contained furnishings and paintings; but these works, including the pavilions, were spare and modern. The modern architecture of Le Corbusier and Konstantin Melnikov attracted both criticism and admiration for its lack of ornamentation. Criticism focused on the 'nakedness' of these structures, compared to other pavilions at the exhibition, such as the Pavilion of the Collector by the ébéniste-decorator Émile-Jacques Ruhlmann.

In 1926, shortly after the end of the Paris Decorative Arts exposition, The French Union of Modern Artists, a group which included Francis Jourdain, Pierre Chareau, Le Corbusier, and Robert Mallet-Stevens among others, fiercely attacked the style, which they said was created only for the wealthy and its form was determined by their tastes. The modernists, as they became known, insisted that well-constructed buildings should be available to everyone, and that form should follow function. The beauty of an object or building resided in whether it was perfectly fit to fulfill its function. Modern industrial methods meant that furniture and buildings could be mass-produced, not made by hand.

The Art Deco interior designer Paul Follot defended Art Deco in this way: "We know that man is never content with the indispensable and that the superfluous is always needed...If not, we would have to get rid of music, flowers, and perfumes..!" However, Le Corbusier was a brilliant publicist for modernist architecture; he stated that a house was simply "a machine to live in", and tirelessly promoted the idea that Art Deco was the past and modernism was the future. Le Corbusier's ideas were gradually adopted by architecture schools, and the aesthetics of Art Deco were abandoned. The economy of the 1930s also favored modernism; modernist buildings, without ornament, used less expensive materials and were cheaper to build, and thus were considered more suitable for the times. The outbreak of World War II in 1939 brought a sharp end to the Art Deco period.

Architectural historian Dennis Sharp wrote that modernist architecture had arisen from the exhibition.

From 22 October 2025 to 26 April 2026, the Musée des Arts Décoratifs celebrated the centenary of the exposition with 1925-2025. One Hundred Years of Art Deco. The exhibit of nearly 1,200 object focuses on “Art Deco’s Parisian origins and manifestations.”

== See also ==
- Art Deco in Paris
