= Józef Czajkowski =

Polish painter and architect (1872–1947)

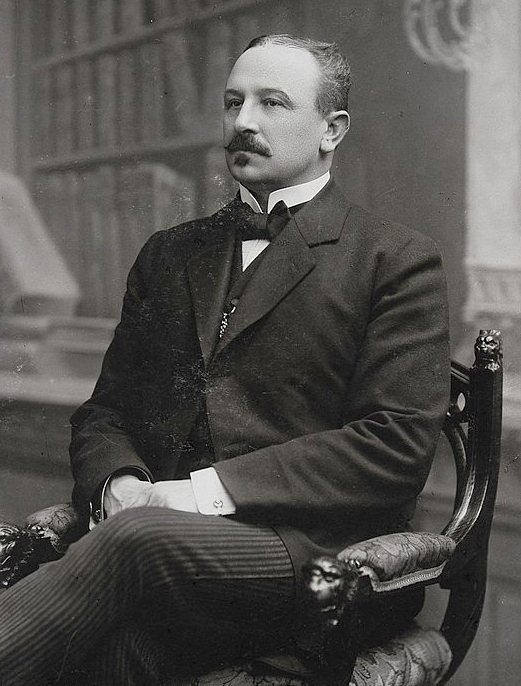
Józef Czajkowski in 1920

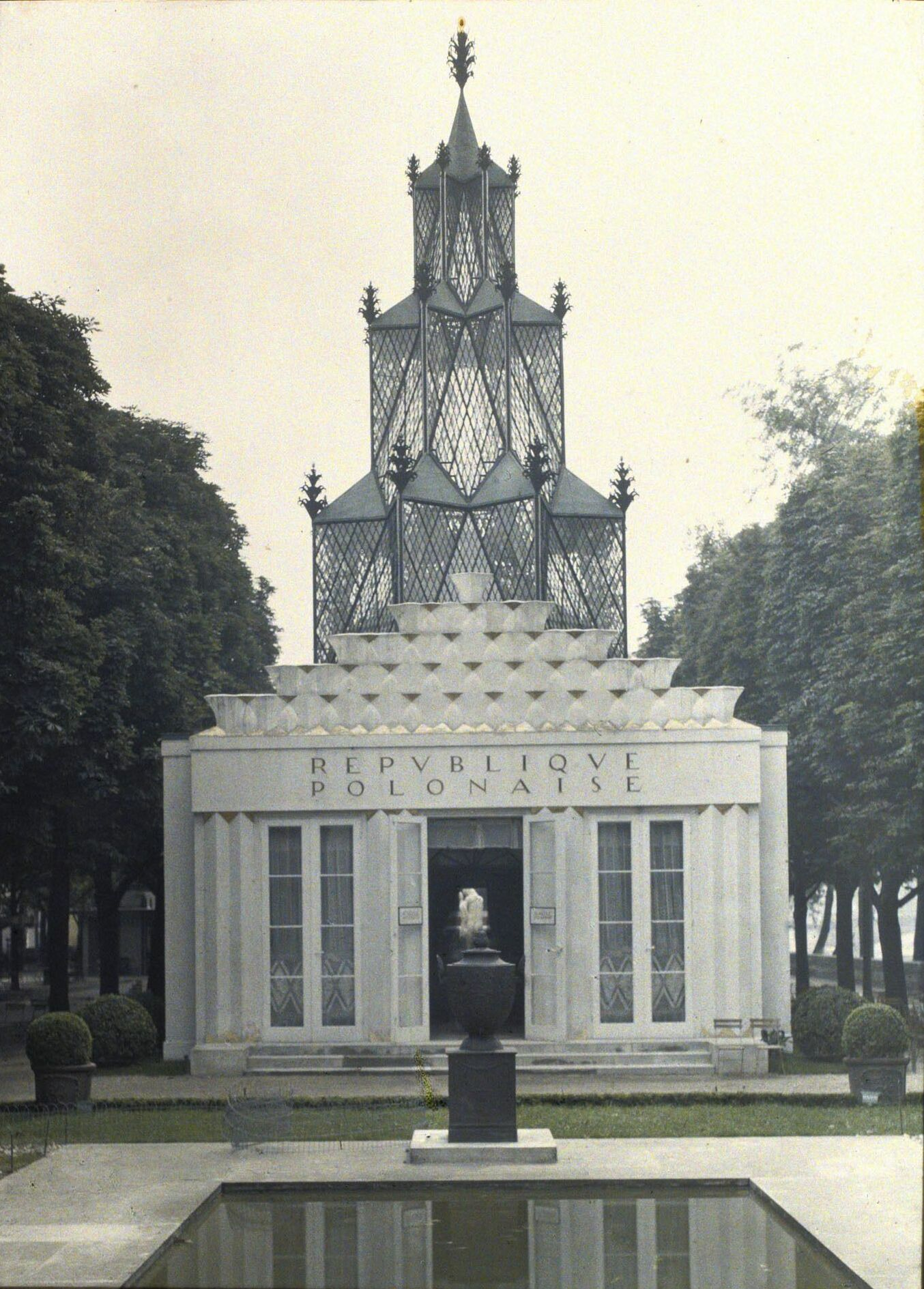
Polish Pavilion' designed and built for the Exposition internationale des arts décoratifs et industriels modernes, Paris, 1925

Józef Czajkowski; 21 January 1872 – 27 July 1947) was a Polish architect, furniture designer, and painter of international renown.

Czajkowski's arts in all forms sought to distill and improve upon that which was best about Polish tradition, and his aim was to celebrate the culture of the people his art served. He was born and died in Warsaw. He wrote, in 1928, "Poland has been politically resurrected and it shall be reborn internally as well, and as such it must find its visual mode of expression. [...] It was through art that Poland endured from within during the invasion, and it is through art in these times of freedom that it must win the place it deserves in the world of culture, bringing in its own creative values. For like no other nation it cannot live without its own language, and so it cannot live without its own visual form in all its possible incarnations." . For example, the glass and iron tower of his Polish Pavilion at the International Exhibition of Modern Decorative and Industrial Arts was a deco rendition of 17th and 18th century Polish churches, inspired by the traditional manor houses of the Polish nobility(szlachta), and the Zakopane Style.

== Bibliography ==
- Charles, Victoria (2013). Art Déco. Parkstone International. ISBN 978-1-84484-864-5.

== See also ==
- Biography
- a brief description of several paintings, including medium resolution images
